= Ben Morton =

Ben Morton may refer to:

- Benny Morton (1907–1985), American jazz trombonist
- Ben Morton (footballer) (1910–1962), English forward
- Ben Morton (politician) (born 1981), Australian House of Representatives member

== See also ==
- Benjamin Morton House, 1927 brick home in Knoxville, Tennessee, on National Register of Historic Places
