= Emory Place Historic District =

Historic district in Tennessee, United States

- U.S. National Register of Historic Places
- U.S. Historic district
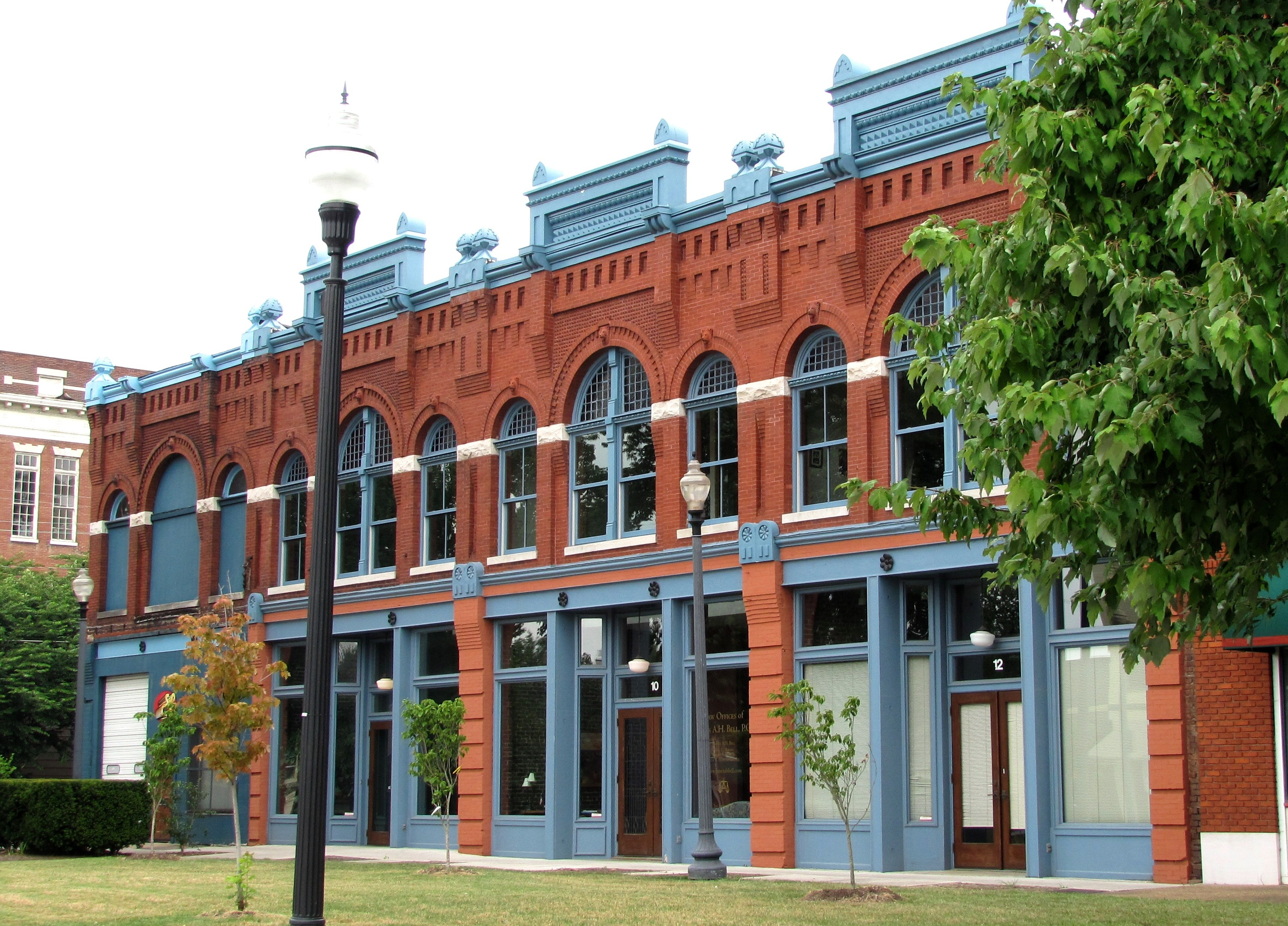
- 6-12 Emory Place

- Location within Tennessee Location within the United States
- Location: Roughly bounded by Broadway, N. Central, Emory, Fifth, East Fourth, and King; Knoxville, Tennessee
- Coordinates: 35°58′26.65″N 83°55′20.94″W
- Area: approximately 10 acres (4.0 ha)
- Built: 1880–1930
- Architect: Charles I. Barber, Albert Baumann, Sr., Dean Parmalee, R. F. Graf, etc.
- Architectural style: Romanesque Revival, Neoclassical Revival
- NRHP reference No.: 94001259 (original); 100008890 (increase 1); 100011549 (increase 2)

Significant dates
- Added to NRHP: November 10, 1994
- Boundary increases: April 20, 2023; March 20, 2025

The Emory Place Historic District is a historic district in Knoxville, Tennessee, United States, located just north of the city's downtown area. The district consists of several commercial, residential, religious, and public buildings that developed around a late nineteenth century train and trolley station. The district includes the Knoxville High School building, St. John's Lutheran Church, First Christian Church, and some of the few surviving rowhouses in Knoxville. The district was listed on the National Register of Historic Places in 1994, with boundary increases in 2023 and 2025.

Following railroad construction in the 1850s, Knoxville slowly expanded northward. In 1890, the "Dummy Line," a railroad line connecting Knoxville and Fountain City, was established, with what is now Emory Place as its southern terminus. A farmers' market and several small industrial and commercial firms developed adjacent to the train station to take advantage of the influx of customers and transportation advantages. While Emory Place declined with the dismantling of Knoxville's trolley system in the late 1940s, many of its late-nineteenth and early-twentieth century buildings still stand, and have been restored.

== Location ==
The Emory Place Historic District is situated around a triangular-shaped area created by the intersections of Broadway and Central Street on the north, Broadway and Fifth Avenue on the southwest, and Central and Fifth on the southeast. Interstate 40 and the Southern Railway tracks divide the district from downtown Knoxville to the south. The Fourth and Gill neighborhood lies to the north, and Old Gray Cemetery lies opposite Broadway to the west.

Emory Place itself is a cross street connecting Central and Broadway. The street was once a wide avenue, much of which has been converted into parking space. Gay Street, downtown Knoxville's main thoroughfare, traverses the Emory Place Historic District, and terminates at Emory Place.

== History ==
=== Early history ===
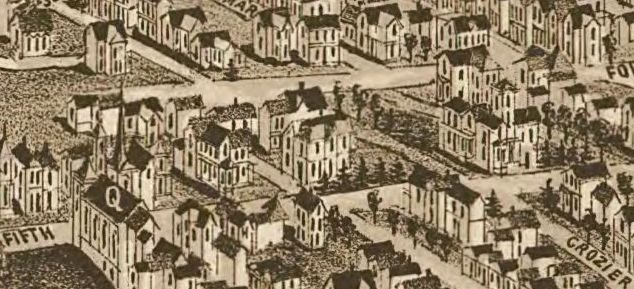
Emory Place (the wide road at the top) and vicinity, as it appeared on an 1886 map of Knoxville

What is now Emory Place was mostly farmland during the first half of the nineteenth century. In the 1850s, two events took place that led to the development of the Emory Place area. The first was the establishment of Old Gray Cemetery in 1850, which served as a de facto public park, and drew pedestrians to the area. The second event was the construction of the railroad, which reached Knoxville in 1855, pushing the city's northern limits to what is now the Southern Railway tracks. The Emory Place area was annexed in 1855.

On July 20, 1863, at the height of the Civil War, Union General William P. Sanders placed artillery along what is now the section of Fifth Avenue between Broadway and Central, and proceeded to shell Knoxville, which was then held by Confederate forces. Return fire scattered the Union artillery, however, and Sanders was forced to retreat. During the Siege of Knoxville in late 1863, Confederate lines stretched across roughly the same area.

After the war, Knoxville continued to expand northward. By 1867, the Knoxville Foundry had been established near what is now the intersection of Broadway and Depot. Farmers from the rural areas north of the city began selling produce out of wagons along what is now Emory Place to Knoxvillians visiting Old Gray Cemetery, and by the late 1880s, Emory Place had become known as "Central Market."

=== The Dummy Line ===
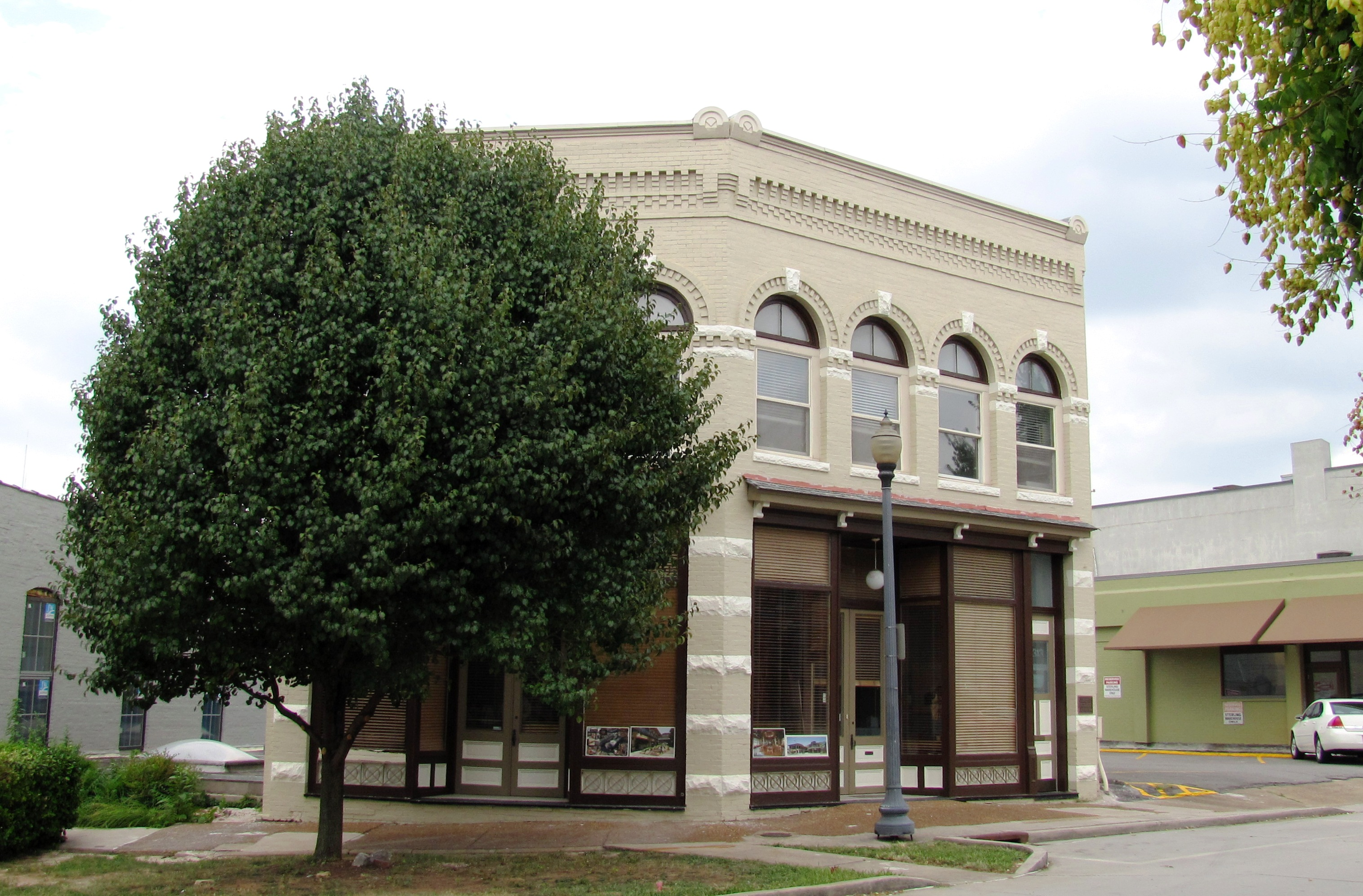
The Whittle and Spence Trunk Company building, constructed in 1890

In 1890, the Fountain City Railroad, commonly called the "Dummy Line," was built to connect Knoxville to the Fountain Head resort at Fountain City. A depot was built at the corner of Broadway and Emory Place that provided the railroad's southern terminus, and the area around the depot began to grow. A large, 33-stall market house was built for the Central Market farmers around the time of the railroad's completion. Small industries also sprang up near the depot, among them the Whittle and Spence Trunk Company (1890), the Knoxville Candy Company (1891), and the Walla Walla Gum Company (1896).

Many of the new businessmen and residents of Emory Place were the children and grandchildren of Irish and German immigrants, who had come to Knoxville in previous decades to help build the railroads. The city's second Catholic church, the Holy Ghost, sprang up along North Central, and St. John's Lutheran Church was erected by second-generation German immigrants. At one point during this period, businessmen operating in the Emory Place district included several Irish saloon keepers and an Irish tinner, a Swiss barber, a Jewish tailor, a Jewish drugstore owner, and an African-American shoe maker.

"Emory Place" is named for Reverend Isaac Emory (1830–1904), a New York-born minister who moved to a farm north of Knoxville just after the Civil War, and spent several decades establishing Sunday schools across the state. In 1904, Emory was killed in the New Market train wreck, and a park adjacent to the Central Markethouse was renamed "Emory Park" in his honor. The park remained Knoxville's only urban park until it was removed in the 1950s and replaced with parking lots.

=== Twentieth Century ===
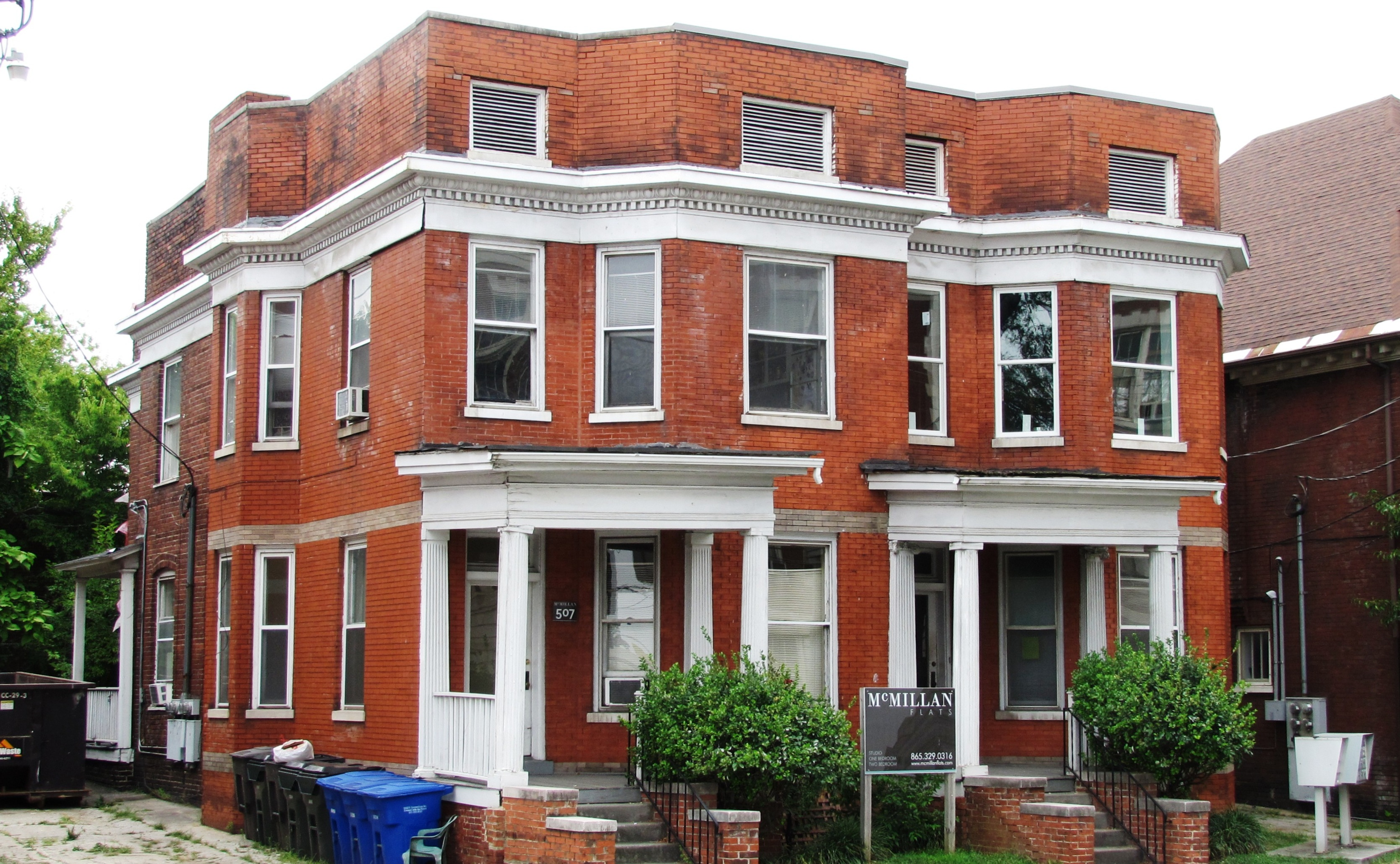
Rowhouses at 507-509 North Central, built circa 1905

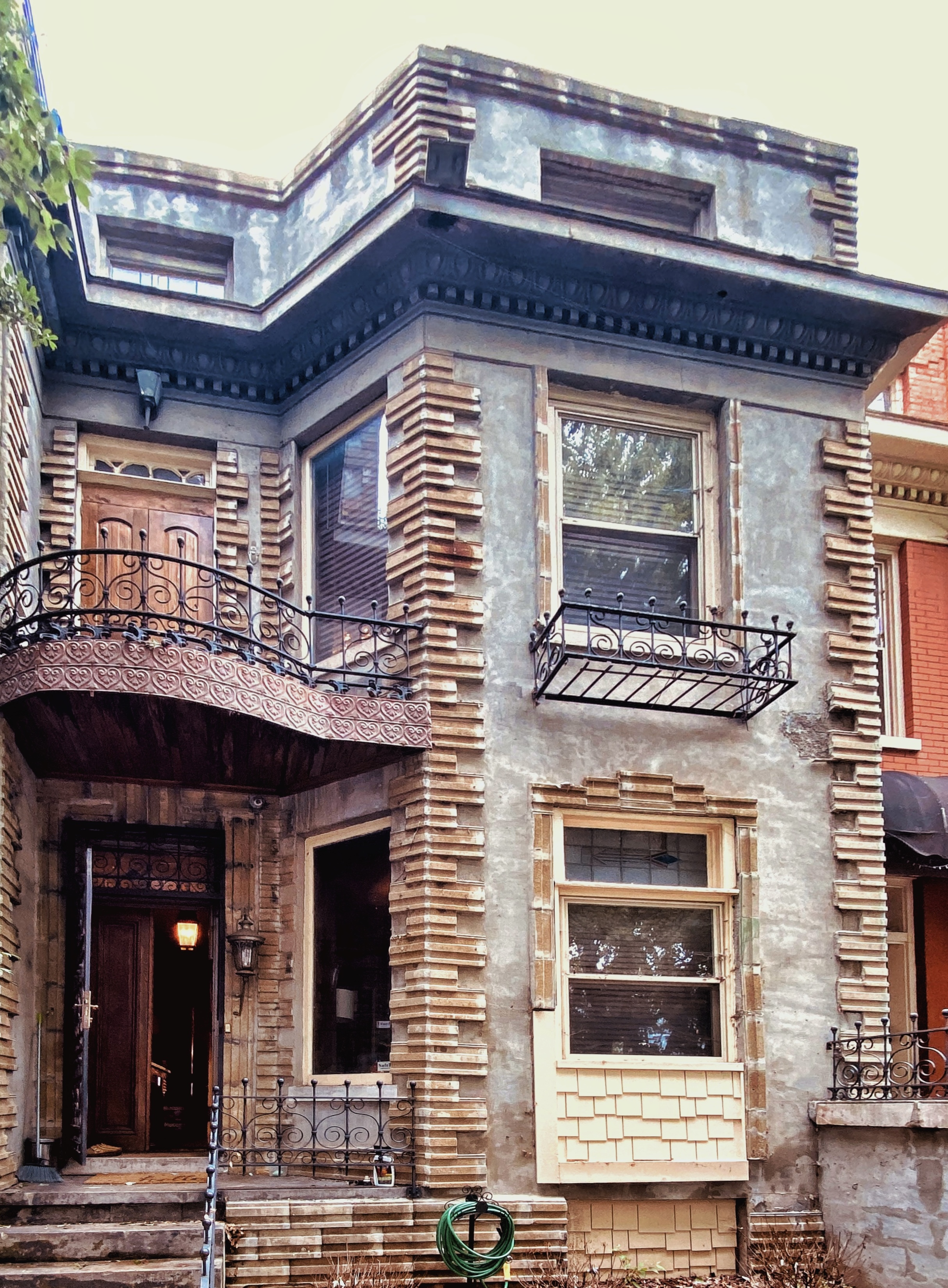
The residence of the late Kristopher Kendrick located in the McMillan Flats (built circa 1900)

In 1905, the Dummy Line was replaced by an electric trolley, and Emory Place gradually became a residential neighborhood as many of its small industries failed or moved away. Several rowhouses and residential apartments were built along Central and Fifth, among them the Sterchi (now Sterchi Oaks) and the Lucerne. Knoxville High School was built in 1910, its location at the corner of Fifth and Central chosen in part for its proximity to the trolley station at Emory Place.

With the dismantling of the trolley system in 1947 and the construction of the Magnolia Expressway (now part of I-40) in 1951, Emory Place began to decline. Car dealerships— starting with the Worsham-Stockton Motor Company (1922) and the Knoxville Buick Company (1927), both on North Gay— were the most prominent businesses at Emory Place until the 1970s.

Since the 1980s, many of the buildings at Emory Place have been rehabilitated, and several of the old rowhouses and hotels have been converted into condominiums. In 2010, a development group, Emory Place Partners, purchased several Emory Place properties with plans to rehabilitate and restore them for use as office and retail space.

== Notable buildings ==
The Emory Place Historic District consists of 23 contributing buildings and one contributing object (the "Doughboy" statue on the front lawn of the Knoxville High School building). Most of the buildings were constructed in the early 1900s, with the two oldest– 6-12 Emory Place and 15-17 Emory Place– completed in 1890. Architectural styles represented in the district include Colonial Revival, Neoclassical, and Richardsonian Romanesque. The St. John's Lutheran Church, at the corner of Emory Place and Broadway, was listed individually on the National Register in 1985.

=== Knoxville High School ===
The Knoxville High School building is a two-story Neoclassical/Beaux-Arts structure completed in 1910. The building was designed by noted Knoxville architect Albert Baumann, Sr., of the firm Baumann Brothers, and later of Baumann and Baumann. Knoxville High School operated out of the building from 1910 until 1951, when it was split into four smaller high schools. The Doughboy Statue on the school's front lawn was erected in 1921 to commemorate Knoxville's World War I veterans.

=== First Christian Church ===
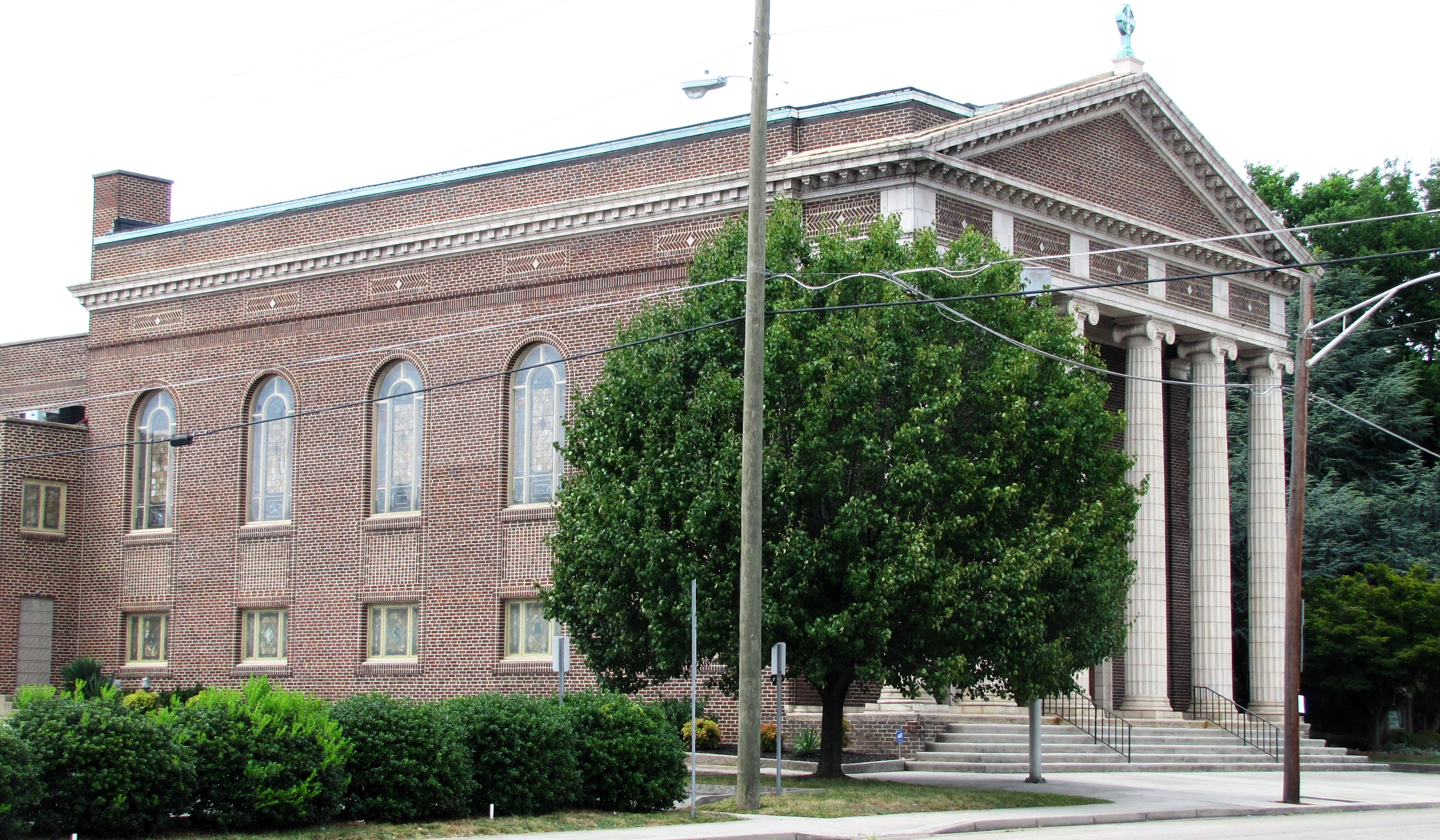
First Christian Church

The First Christian Church (211 W. Fifth Ave.), built in 1913, was designed by noted Knoxville architect Charles I. Barber. Barber also designed the church's adjacent office building and Sunday school building, which were both completed in 1929. The church is home to a Disciples of Christ congregation.

The church is a two-story Neoclassical structure with Romanesque influences. The exterior walls consist of brick, with a marble cornice, marble panels in the side walls, and marble panels with angel carvings above the front entrance. The facade is fronted by six marble columns with Doric capitals, supporting a pediment with marble detailing.

The church's Sunday school building is a two-story Romanesque structure with a Spanish tile roof, and an arched entrance flanked by stone pilasters with Corinthian capitals. The church's educational and office building is a three-story brick structure with a Roman tile roof and arched double doors. The church, Sunday school, and office building surround a central courtyard, and all three buildings are connected by arched passageways.

=== 3 Emory Place ===
3 Emory Place, now one building, was originally three units built by the Walla Walla Gum Manufacturing Company, which manufactured chewing gum in the early twentieth century. The east bay of the building, originally 1 Emory Place, was a commercial vernacular structure built by Walla Walla circa 1903. The middle bay and west bay (originally 3 and 5 Emory Place) were two-story annexes built by Walla Walla circa 1919 and 1921, respectively. In 2010, the building was restored by the architectural firm, Sanders Pace, and is currently occupied by an office design company, Ivan Allen Workspace.

=== 6-12 Emory Place ===
6-12 Emory Place, sometimes called the W. F. Green and Company Grocery Store building after an early occupant, is a two-story brick Richardsonian Romanesque structure built in 1890. The building is four bays wide with brick pilasters between each bay. The building's second story has arched windows with ashlar limestone bases.

=== 15-17 Emory Place ===
15-17 Emory Place, called the Whittle and Spence Trunk Company building after its first owner, is a two-story Richardsonian Romanesque-style structure built in 1890. The building follows an irregular plan, with the facade of one half of the building facing south, and the facade of the other half facing southeast. The building is currently occupied by an accounting firm, Two Roads.

=== The Lucerne ===
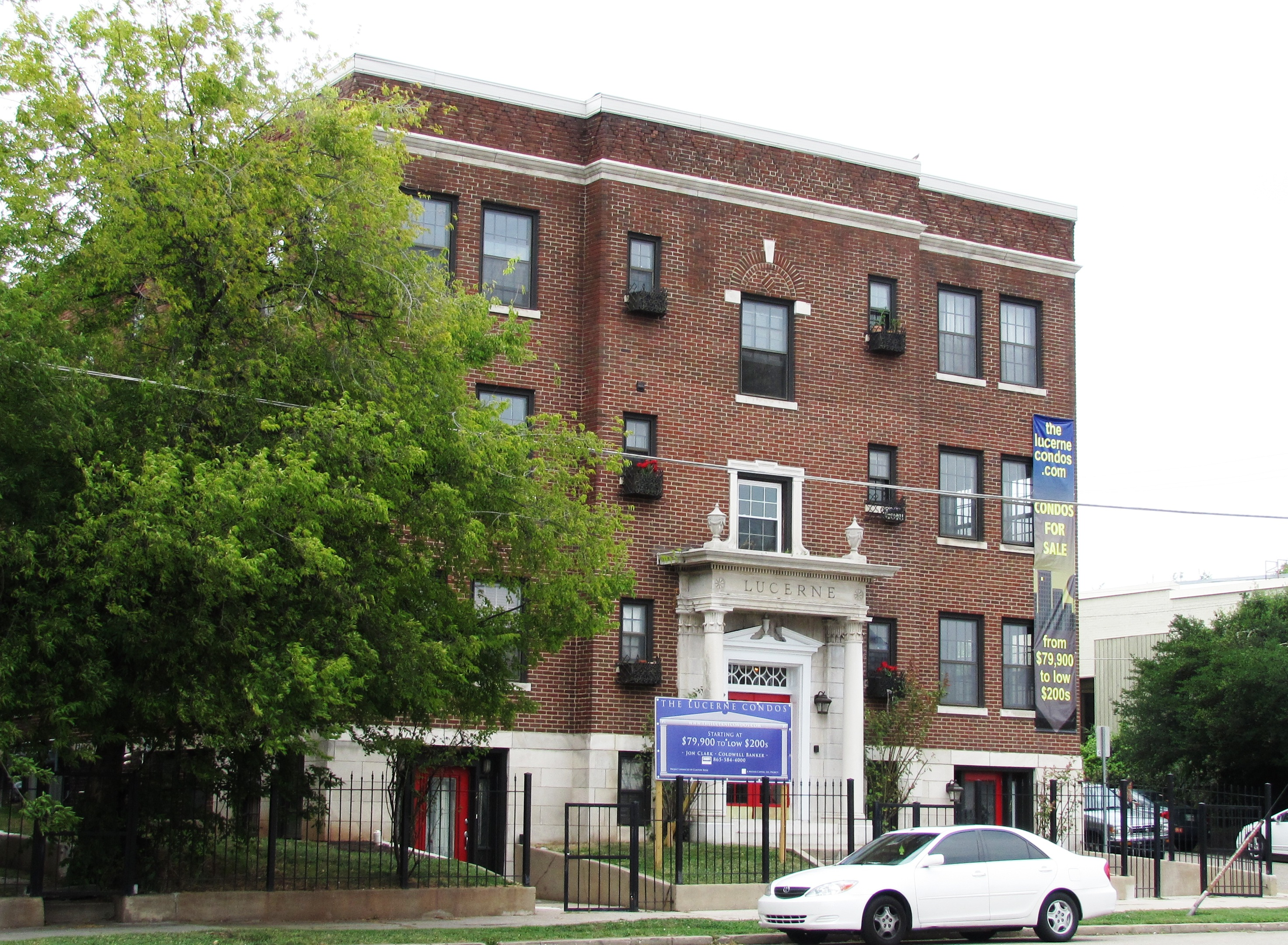
The Lucerne

The Lucerne (201 West Fifth Avenue) is a three-story brick Neoclassical-style apartment building constructed circa 1925 by furniture store magnate James G. Sterchi. The building has a front portico with stone Corinthian columns, a flat roof with a limestone cornice and parapet, and an ashlar limestone foundation. In its early years, the basement of the Lucerne was home to the Fifth Avenue Tea Room, a popular gathering place among local women. The building is now a condominium operated by Lucerne Condos, Inc.

=== Sterchi Oaks ===
Sterchi Oaks (205 West Fifth Avenue) is a three-story brick Neoclassical-style apartment building, also constructed circa 1910 by James G. Sterchi. The building has extended porches and balconies on all three levels. The first-story porch consists of a brick arcade supported by marble piers. The second-story balcony has four Doric columns and a brick balustrade. The third-story balcony has wooden Doric posts and a brick balustrade. The building is now a condominium operated by Lucerne Condos, Inc.

=== Patterson Cottage ===
Patterson Cottage (605 King street), also called "L'Hotel" after an early owner, is a two-story brick Neoclassical apartment building constructed circa 1910. A limestone cornice surrounds the top of the building, just above the second floor. The building is now a condominium operated by Lucerne Condos, Inc.

=== 507-509 N. Central Street ===
507-509 N. Central Street, now called McMillan Place, is a two-story, two-unit, Colonial Revival-style rowhouse built circa 1905. The building has a brick exterior and foundation, and a flat roof and a metal cornice. The front porches are lined with wooden columns with Doric capitals and a sawn wood balustrade.

== See also ==
- Battle of Depot Street
- South Market Historic District
