= BarberMcMurry =

American architecture firm

BarberMcMurry Architects

Practice information
- Key architects: Chuck Griffin, AIA, NCARB (President); Kelly Headden, AIA (Senior Vice President); Mike Dooley, AIA (Vice President); Ryan Dobbs, AIA (Vice President); Ronald Bomers, AIA (Senior Partner); Robert Parrott, FAIA (Senior Partner); David Wooley, FAIA (Senior Partner)
- Founded: 1915
- Location: Knoxville, Tennessee

Significant works and honors
- Buildings: Candoro Marble Works showroom (1923), General Building (1926), Holston Hills Country Club (1927), Knoxville YMCA (1928), Church Street United Methodist Church (1931), Great Smoky Mountains National Park headquarters (1940), Fort Sanders Regional Medical Center (1956), Rokeby Condominiums (1976), East Tennessee History Center (1985), John J. Duncan Federal Building (1988), Smokies Park (2000), LeConte Medical Center (2010), King Family Sevier County Library (2011), University of Tennessee Medical Center - Cancer Institute (2012), BarberMcMurry Offices - The Arnstein Building (2013), University of Tennessee Natalie L. Haslam Music Building (2013), Rocky Top Sports World (2014), Hicks Orthodontic Clinic (2014), Webb School Haslam Gymnasium (2014), Contemporary Women's Health Center (2015), University of Tennessee Student Union - Phase 1 (2015), University of Tennessee Joint Institute for Advanced Materials (2015), Knox County Forensic Center (2015), East Tennessee Children's Hospital (2016), Sacred Heart Cathedral (2017)
- Awards: 1976 AIA Gulf States Honor Award for Design Excellence (Rokeby Condominiums), 2004 ASID Design Awards (East Tennessee Children's Hospital), 2010 AIA Gulf States Design Award (Pellissippi State - Magnolia Campus)

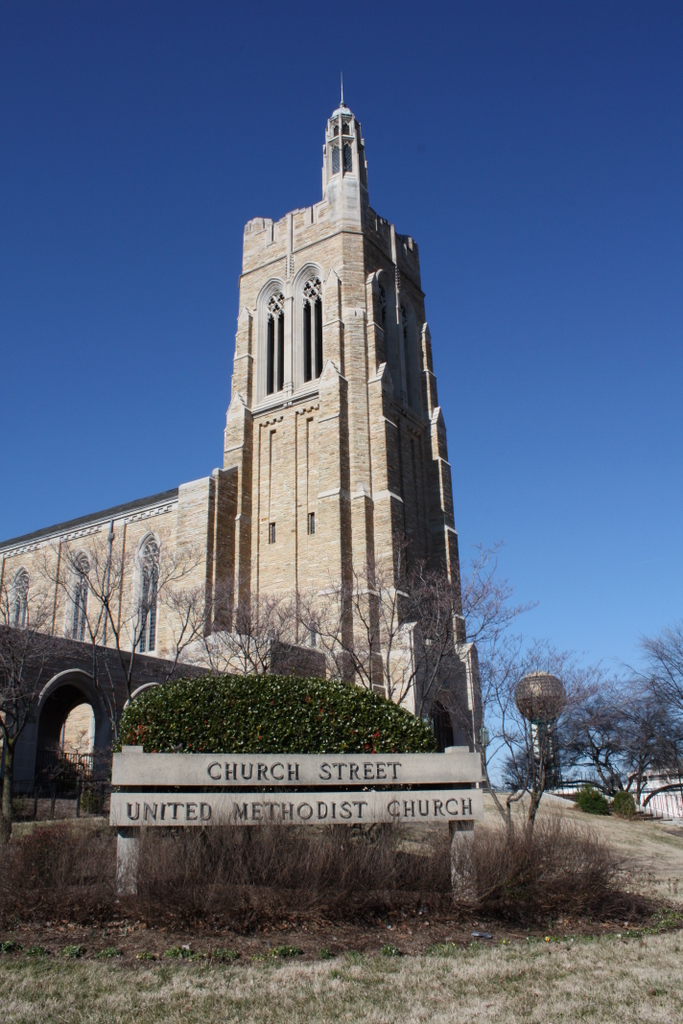
Church Street Methodist Church (Knoxville, Tennessee), designed with John Russell Pope architects

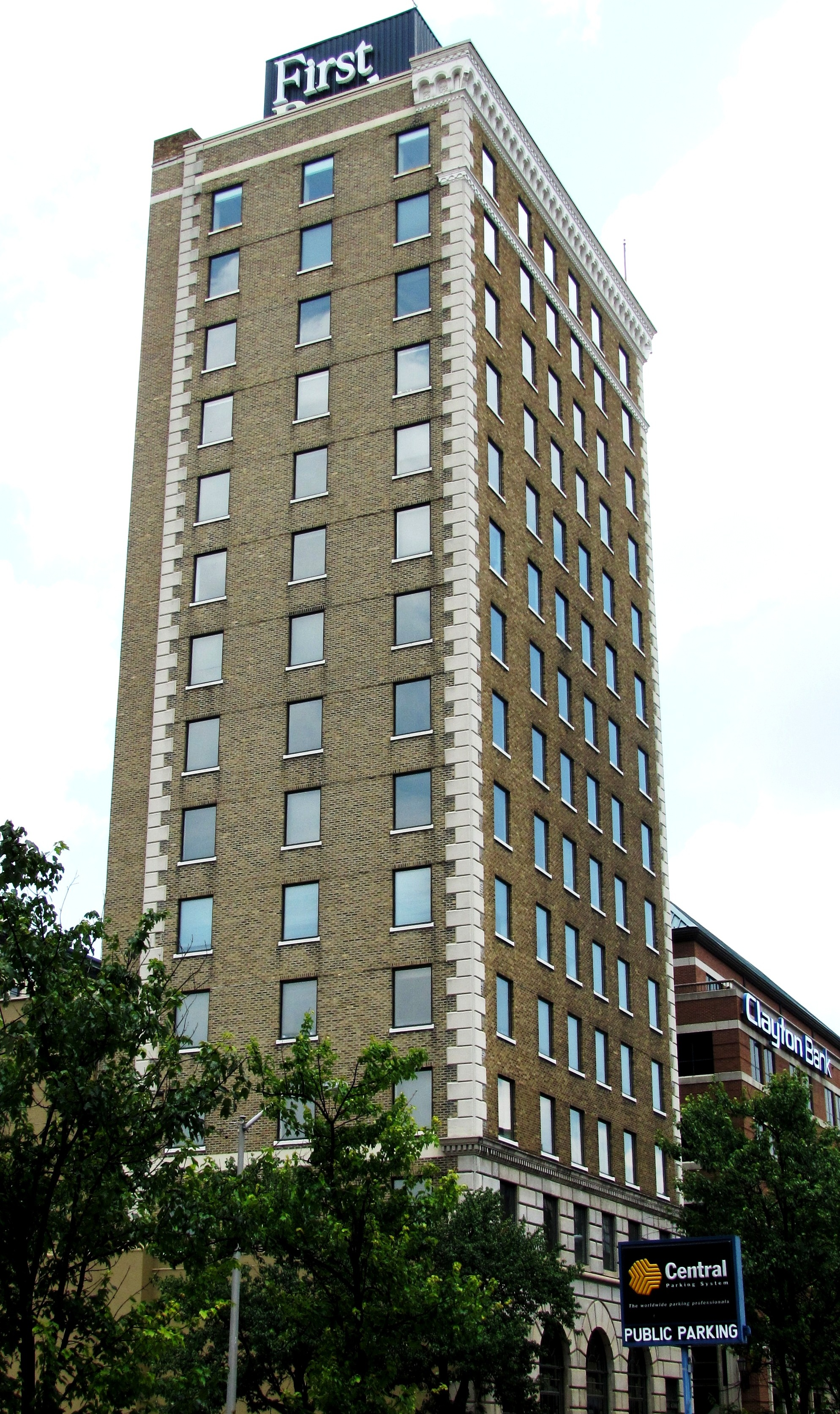
General Building

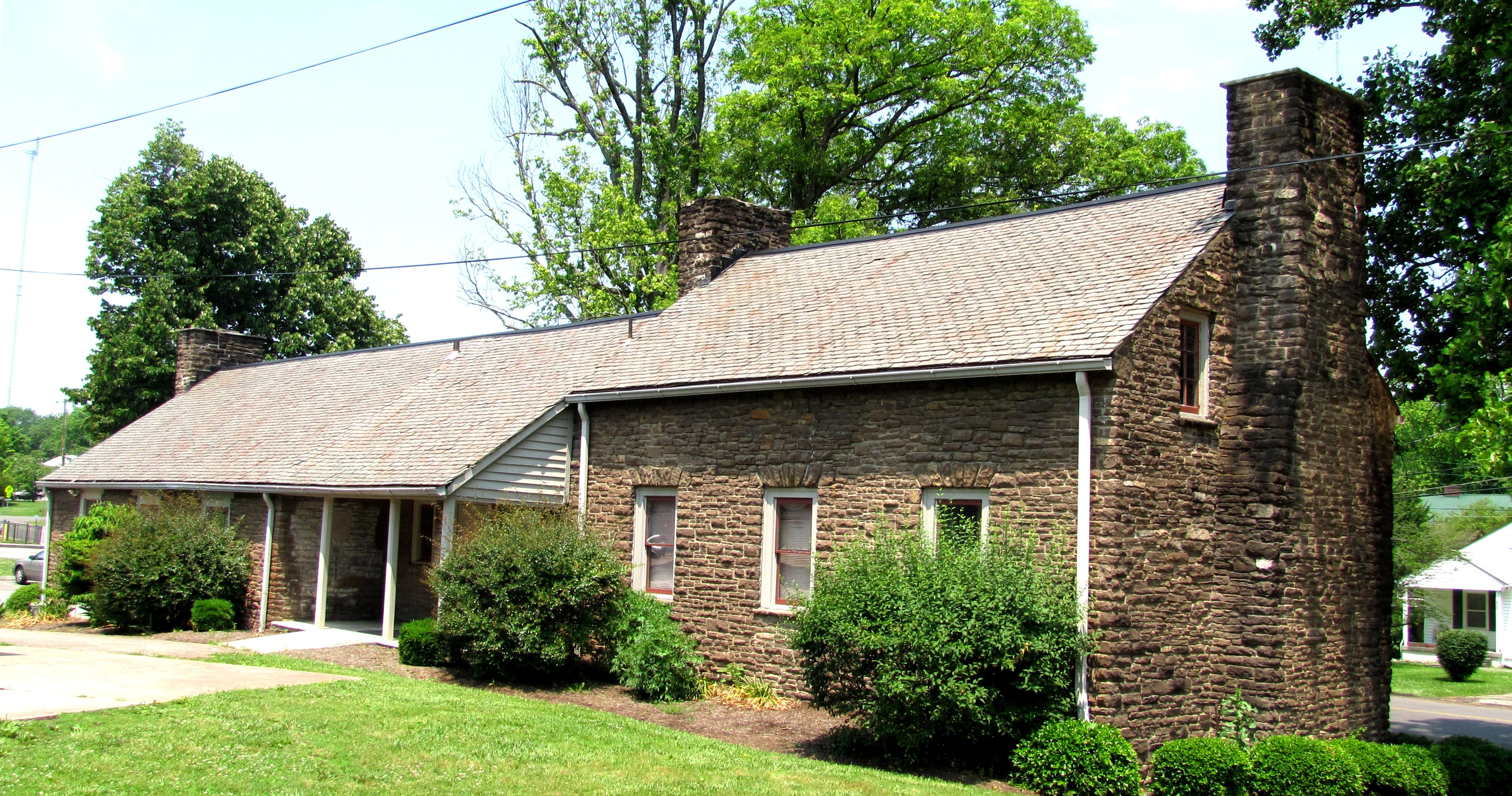
Christenberry Club Room, Knoxville

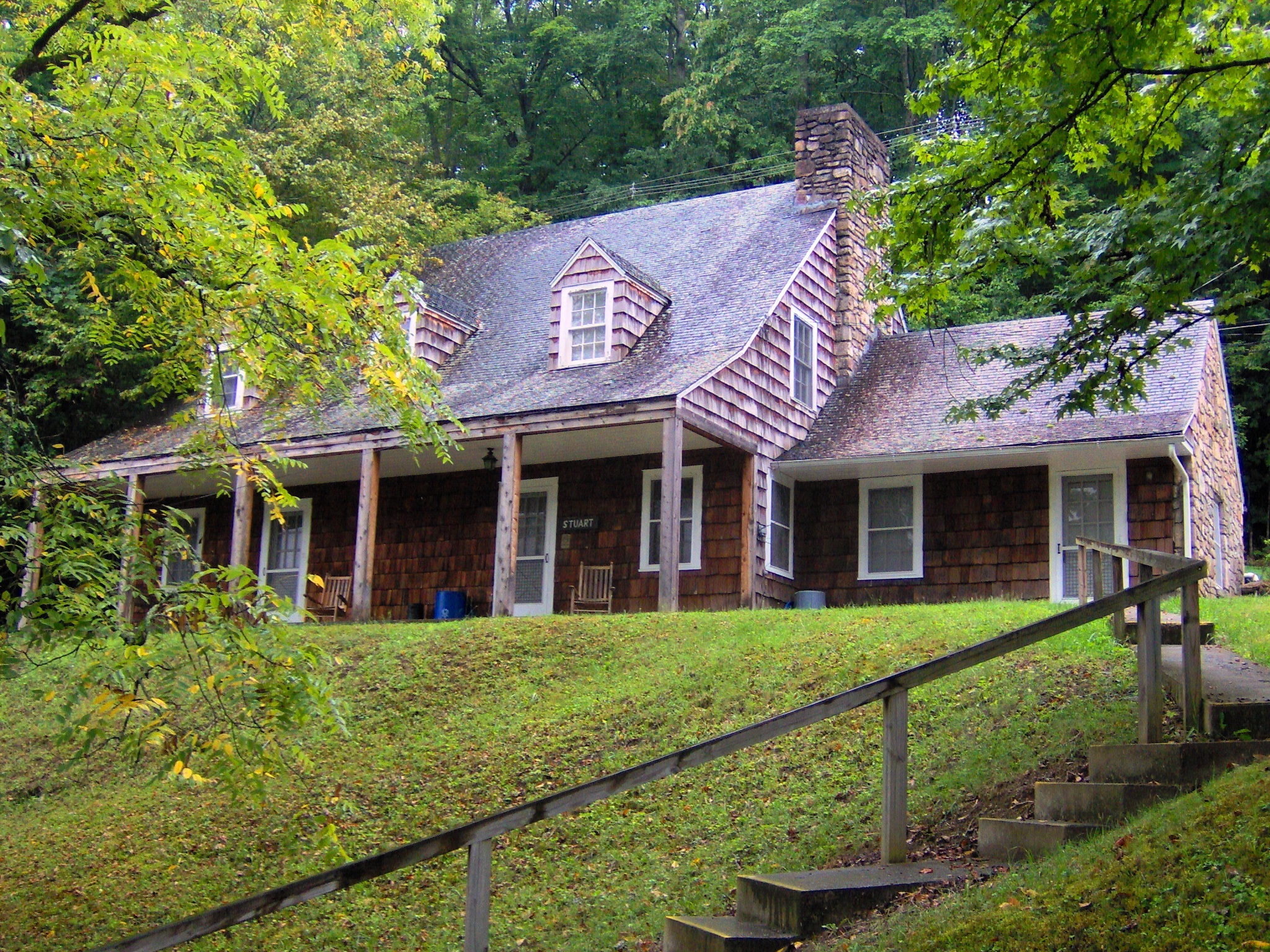
Stuart Dormitory, within Settlement School Dormitories and Dwellings Historic District

BarberMcMurry, formerly Barber & McMurry, is an architecture firm based in Knoxville, Tennessee, USA. Founded in 1915 by Charles Irving Barber (1887–1962) and Benjamin Franklin McMurry, Sr. (1885–1969), the firm designed dozens of notable houses, churches, schools, and public facilities in Knoxville and the surrounding region in the early 20th century, several of which have been listed on the National Register of Historic Places. In recent decades, the firm has expanded its focus to include larger-scale projects, such as hospitals, stadiums and retail complexes.

BarberMcMurry is rooted in the successful mail-order design business established in Knoxville in 1888 by Charles Barber's father, George Franklin Barber (1854–1915), best known for his elaborate Victorian mansions. Both Charles Barber and Benjamin McMurry studied at the University of Pennsylvania under Paul Cret, whose Beaux-Arts influence characterized much of the firm's early work. By the time of Barber's death in 1962, the firm had designed some of Knoxville most elegant houses, many of which still stand in West Knoxville, as well as over 50 churches, and government buildings such as the Great Smoky Mountains National Park headquarters.

The firm's more recent work includes the East Tennessee History Center (1985), the John J. Duncan Federal Building (1988), Smokies Park (2000), the Niswonger Performing Arts Center (2004), and the LeConte Medical Center (2010). Current projects include the Sentinel Tower and the University of Tennessee Music Center.

== History ==
George Franklin Barber moved to Knoxville from his native DeKalb, Illinois, in 1888, bringing along his wife, Laura, and infant son, Charles. While in DeKalb, George had begun working as an architect for his brother's construction company, and published his first design catalog, The Cottage Souvenir. In Knoxville, he expanded his catalog business, and over the subsequent two decades sold upwards of 20,000 house plans worldwide. Several dozen George Barber houses still stand in Knoxville alone, including a house at 1635 Washington Avenue where the Barbers lived in the early 1890s.

Charles practically grew up in his father's offices. In 1907, he toured Italy and Greece, where he observed the proper design of Mediterranean villas. Following his return, he enrolled in the University of Pennsylvania, where he studied architecture under Paul Cret, a French-born architect widely credited with spreading the Beaux-Arts philosophy in America. Following his graduation in 1911, he worked for his father's firm, and in several brief partnerships.

In 1915, Charles Barber and his fellow University of Pennsylvania alumni, David West Barber (his cousin) and Benjamin McMurry, founded the firm, Barber & McMurry. The Barbers' partner, Benjamin McMurry, was born and raised in Blount County, Tennessee, and had attended Maryville College before enrolling in the University of Pennsylvania. He also studied under Cret, and graduated in 1912.

The firm's earliest works included several elaborate mansions built for affluent Knoxvillians, many of which still stand in the Sequoyah Hills vicinity in West Knoxville. In the 1920s and 1930s, the firm expanded to non-domestic projects, such as the General Building (1926), the Holston Hills Country Club (1927), the Church Street Methodist Church (1931), and the University of Tennessee's Hoskins Library (1931). The firm also designed government facilities, such as the Great Smoky Mountains National Park headquarters (1940).

=== Post-World War II ===
By the end of the 1950s, Barber & McMurry had designed over 50 churches, 14 schools, dozens of elaborate houses, several clubhouses, and more than a half-dozen buildings for the University of Tennessee campus, several of which surround Ayres Hall atop the "Hill." Notable architects such as Bruce McCarty began their careers with the firm as draftsmen or interns. In 1976, the firm's work was the subject of an exhibition by Knoxville's Dulin Art Gallery. In the early 21st century, the firm changed its name to "BarberMcMurry."

In recent years, the firm has designed several major medical centers in Knoxville and the surrounding region, most notably the LeConte Medical Center (2010) in Sevierville, the University of Tennessee Heart Hospital (2010), and Mercy Medical Center North (2007). The firm continues to design and rehabilitate buildings for the University of Tennessee, and has designed structures for several local community colleges and high schools. The firm has recently wrapped up design and construction of their new downtown Knoxville office space which is located in the historic Arnstein building.

== Works ==
BarberMcMurry's early work (c. 1915–1940) reflected the Beaux-Arts influence that Charles Barber and Ben McMurry absorbed from Paul Cret at the University of Pennsylvania. Beaux Arts elements were incorporated into historical styles, which ranged from Mediterranean and English Cottage-style houses, Gothic-style churches, and Neoclassical-style schools. While Barber's work bears little resemblance to his father's Victorian house plans, his work placed an emphasis on harmony with nature that was at the heart of his father's architectural philosophy.

After World War II, the firm's work evolved to reflect contemporary styles, most noticeable in commercial works such as the Fort Sanders Medical Center (1958) and the Modern-style Jenkins House (1955) in Sequoyah Hills. Over the past two decades, the firm has focused on LEED design principles, which emphasizes energy efficiency and environmentally friendly construction. The firm has also expanded to include interior design, with notable interior design works that the East Tennessee Children's Hospital.

BarberMcMurry's work has received numerous awards over the past eight decades. The H.M. Goforth House (1928), which once stood on Lyons View Pike, received the gold medal at the Southern Architecture and Industrial Arts Exposition in 1929. In 2008, Oxford American magazine named the Jenkins House one of the top eleven Modern-style houses in the South. Recent designs, such as the Rokeby Condominiums (1976), the Two Rivers Church (2005), and the LeConte Medical Center (2010), have received regional AIA design awards. Over a dozen of the firm's buildings have been listed on the National Register of Historic Places, either individually or as contributing properties in historic districts.
