= St. John's Lutheran Church (Knoxville, Tennessee) =

Historic church in Tennessee, United States

- U.S. National Register of Historic Places
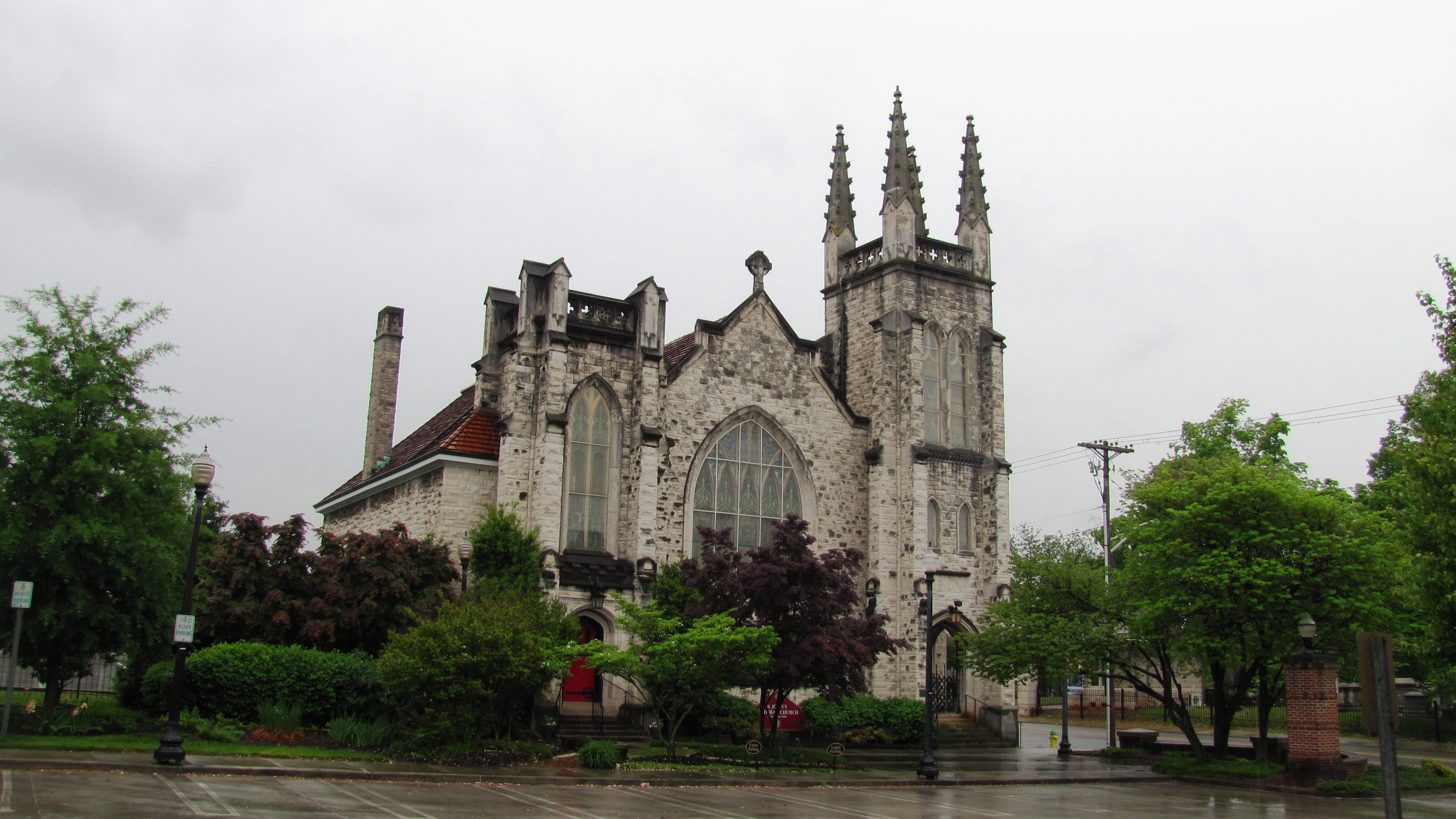

- Location within Tennessee Location within the United States
- Location: Knoxville, Tennessee
- Coordinates: 35°58′26″N 83°55′26″W
- Built: 1912
- Architect: Richard F. Graf
- Architectural style: Late Gothic Revival
- Part of: Emory Place Historic District (ID94001259)
- NRHP reference No.: 85000700
- Added to NRHP: April 4, 1985

St. John's Lutheran Church is a historic Lutheran church located at 544 Broadway NW (Emory Place) in Knoxville, Tennessee. The church building is listed on the National Register of Historic Places, both individually and as a contributing property in the Emory Place Historic District.

== History ==
The St. John's congregation was formed in 1888. It was the first English-language Lutheran congregation in Knoxville. The founding members were Lutherans of German heritage who preferred English over German, which was then used in other local Lutheran churches. Initially, they met for worship in the First German Evangelical Lutheran Church in downtown Knoxville. In 1889, the group leased the former the Broad Street Methodist Episcopal Church building, on the corner of Broadway and Fifth Avenue, for worship use. In 1890, the congregation incorporated, affiliated with the United Synod of the Evangelical Lutheran Church in the South, and purchased the former Broad Street Methodist property.

Development of the current church building began in 1910 after church member Martha Henson donated land one block north of the church building. After adjoining land was acquired, construction of the new church building began in August 1911. The new church was completed and dedicated in 1912. R. F. Graf was the architect of the Gothic Revival style building. Martha Henson contributed almost $90,000 toward the $100,000 cost of the project as a memorial to her husband, James A. Henson. Gothic elements in the building include arches at windows and doorways, exterior buttresses, and tracery. The church's interior utilizes quarter sawn oak. Hammerbeam trusses vault the sanctuary, rising to almost 40 feet (12 m). The sanctuary is surrounded by 61 stained glass windows, including a series of nine pictorial windows that depict scenes from the Bible in chronological sequence. The windows were designed by Von Gerichten Art Glass of Cincinnati and assembled onsite during building construction.

The congregation is affiliated with the Evangelical Lutheran Church in America (ELCA).
