= R. F. Graf =

American architect

- Born: Richard Franklin Graf; May 1, 1863; Nashville, Tennessee, USA
- Died: January 27, 1940 (aged 76); Knoxville, Tennessee, USA
- Occupation: Architect
- Spouse: Ida Lee Vinson
- Children: John, Herbert, Karl, Frank, Katherine, Lawrence

Richard Franklin Graf (1863–1940) was an American architect active primarily in Knoxville, Tennessee and the vicinity in the early 20th century. His works include Stratford Mansion (1910), Sterchi Building (1921), St. John's Lutheran Church (1913), and the Journal Arcade (1924). His home, the Prairie School-inspired Graf House, is considered Knoxville's first modern home. Several buildings designed by Graf have been listed on the National Register of Historic Places.

== Biography ==
Graf was born in Nashville, Tennessee in 1863. His grandfather was one of several families to immigrate from Switzerland to Morgan County in the late 1840s (Morgan County's Swiss immigrants also included the grandparents of one of Graf's future clients, James G. Sterchi). Graf had relocated to Knoxville by 1884, when he was working at the Burr & Terry Sash Factory in what is now the Old City.

In 1887, Graf cofounded a contracting firm, Vinson and Graf, which operated in Knoxville until 1891. In the early 1890s, Graf worked as a supervisor for the Knoxville Cabinet and Mantel Company. In 1894, he joined the firm of noted mail-order architect George Franklin Barber (1854–1915), and was elevated to associate in 1901. He and Barber were still working together as late as 1907, when they designed a new building for Mechanics' National Bank.

Graf eventually formed an architectural firm with his two sons, John R. Graf and Herbert Graf, as supervising architect. In 1910, the firm designed an elaborate Neoclassical mansion, Stratford, for James G. Sterchi, as well as two buildings– the Bandstand and the Liberal Arts Building– for the Appalachian Exposition at Chilhowee Park. Three years later, Graf designed the Gothic-style St. John's Lutheran Church, which still stands across from Old Gray Cemetery on Broadway.

In 1920, Sterchi again commissioned Graf to design his furniture company's 10-story warehouse, now known as Sterchi Lofts, which was completed the following year. The Graf House, the design of which was inspired by the Prairie School movement, was completed in 1923. During this same period, Graf designed two dormitories for Maryville College, Carnegie Hall (1917) and Thaw Hall (1923).

== Works ==
The following were designed by Graf or his firm, R.F. Graf and Sons.

Name	Location	Completed	Status	Other information	Image	Reference
Miller's Building (S. Gay St.)	Knoxville, Tennessee	1905	Standing			
Mechanics' National Bank (612 S. Gay St.)	Knoxville, Tennessee	1907 (approx.)	Standing	With Barber & Kluttz		
Park City High School	Knoxville, Tennessee	1909	Demolished	Designed with George F. Barber & Co.		
Chilhowee Park Bandstand (Chilhowee Park)	Knoxville, Tennessee	1910	Standing	Built for the 1910 Appalachian Exposition		
Appalachian Exposition - Machinery and Liberal Arts Building (Chilhowee Park)	Knoxville, Tennessee	1910	Burned	Built for the 1910 Appalachian Exposition; designed primarily by J.R. Graf		
Stratford	Knoxville, Tennessee	1910	Standing	NRHP (#09000536); designed for furniture magnate James G. Sterchi		
National Conservation Exposition - East Tennessee Building (Chilhowee Park)	Knoxville, Tennessee	1913	Demolished			
National Conservation Exposition - Women's Building (Chilhowee Park)	Knoxville, Tennessee	1913	Demolished			
St. John's Lutheran Church (Broadway)	Knoxville, Tennessee	1913	Standing	NRHP (#85000700)		
2809 Kingston Pike	Knoxville, Tennessee	1915	Standing	NRHP contributing property (Kingston Pike Historic District)		
Carnegie Hall (Maryville College)	Maryville, Tennessee	1917	Standing	NRHP contributing property (Maryville College Historic District)		
Sterchi Building (Sterchi Lofts) (S. Gay St.)	Knoxville, Tennessee	1921	Standing	NRHP contributing property (Southern Terminal and Warehouse Historic District)		
Knoxville Paper Box Company (200 E Magnolia)	Knoxville, Tennessee	1921	Standing			
Evarts High School	Evarts, Kentucky	1923	Standing	School closed in 2009		
Graf House (Woodlawn Pike)	Knoxville, Tennessee	1923	Standing			
Thaw Hall (Maryville College)	Maryville, Tennessee	1923	Standing	NRHP contributing property (Maryville College Historic District)		
Journal Arcade (S. Gay St.)	Knoxville, Tennessee	1924	Standing	NRHP contributing property (Gay Street Commercial Historic District)		

== See also ==
- Charles I. Barber
- Baumann family (architects)
- Thomas Hope
- Bruce McCarty
- Peter Staub
