= Central United Methodist Church (Knoxville, Tennessee) =

Historic church in Tennessee, United States

- U.S. National Register of Historic Places
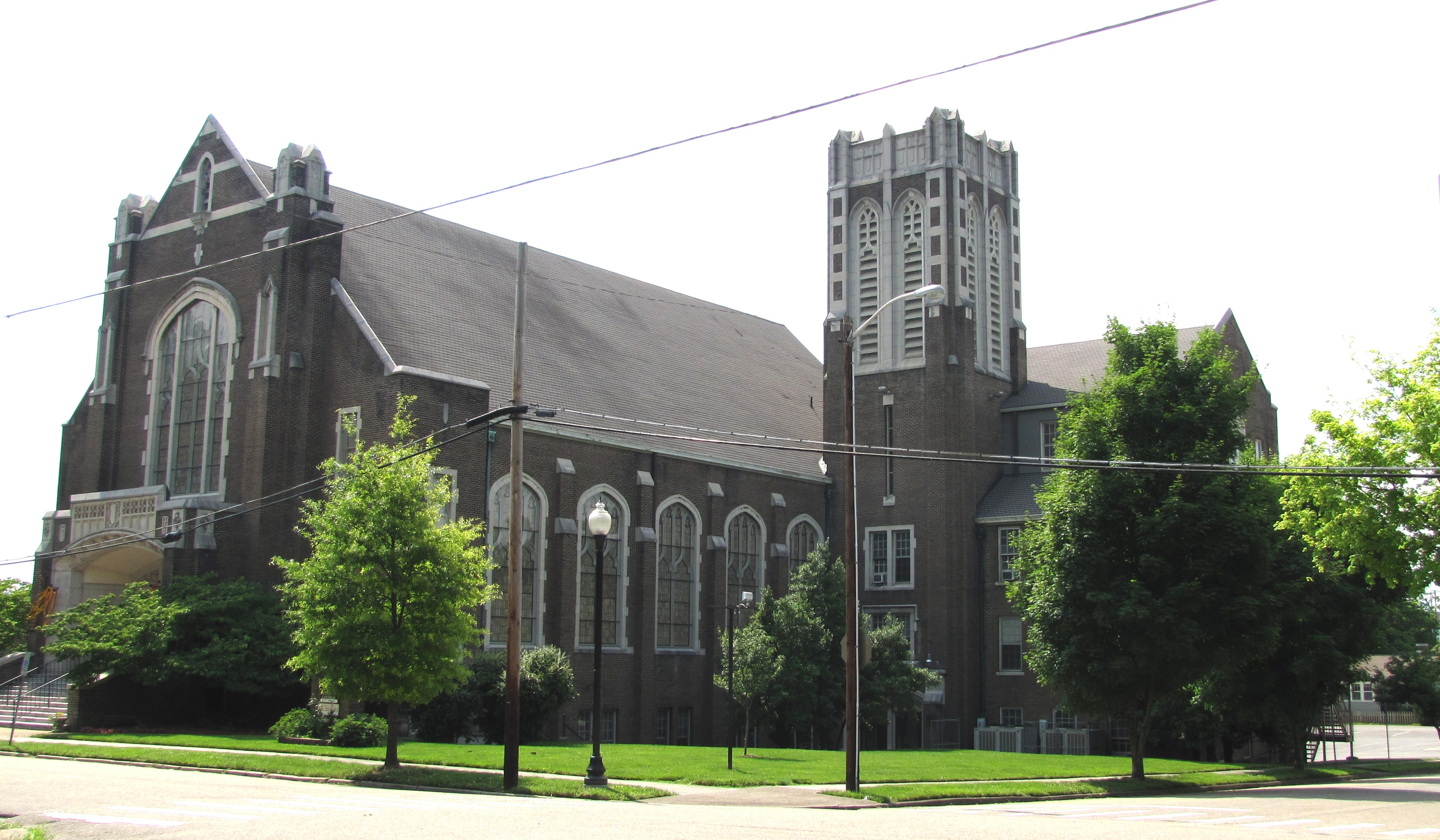

- Location within Tennessee Location within the United States
- Location: 201 E. Third Ave. Knoxville, Tennessee
- Coordinates: 35°58′42″N 83°55′20″W
- Built: 1927
- Architect: Hunt, R.H. and Co.; Baumann, A.B. & Son
- Architectural style: Gothic Revival
- MPS: Knoxville and Knox County MPS
- NRHP reference No.: 05001225
- Added to NRHP: November 9, 2005

Central United Methodist Church is located at 201 East Third Avenue in Knoxville, Tennessee. On November 9, 2005, it was added to the National Register of Historic Places and is listed as a contributing property within the Fourth and Gill Historic District.

The church was organized in 1924 as a merger between Broad Street Methodist and Centenary Methodist churches after a fire destroyed the Broad Street building. The present structure was completed in 1927 in the Gothic Revival style. R.H. Hunt of Chattanooga and Baumann & Baumann of Knoxville were the architects. The exterior of the church is primarily brick, but also includes stone, limestone and marble. At the time of its completion, the sanctuary was Knoxville's largest church auditorium, seating 1,600. The original organ was purchased from the Riviera Theater in 1935. The current organ is an instrument by M.P. Moller of 42 ranks installed in 1958.

The congregation is affiliated with the United Methodist Church.
