= Church Street United Methodist Church =

- U.S. National Register of Historic Places
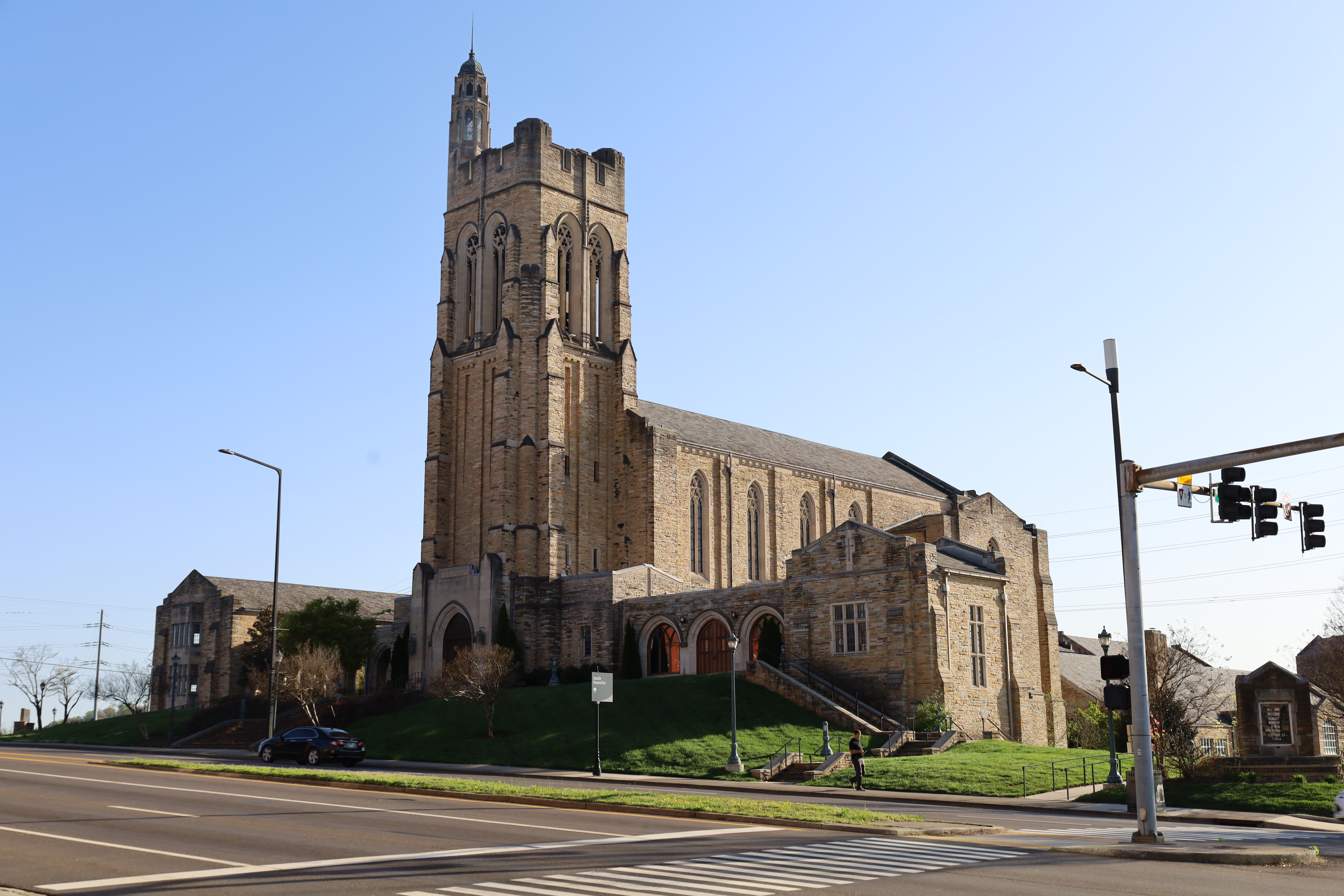
- The church in 2025

- Location within Tennessee Location within the United States
- Location: 913 Henley St., Knoxville, Tennessee
- Coordinates: 35°57′40″N 83°55′14″W
- Area: 4.6 acres (1.9 ha)
- Built: 1930
- Architect: Pope, John Russell; et al.
- Architectural style: Gothic Revival
- MPS: Knoxville and Knox County MPS
- NRHP reference No.: 09000115
- Added to NRHP: March 10, 2009

Church Street United Methodist Church is a United Methodist church located on Henley Street in downtown Knoxville, Tennessee. The church building is considered a Knoxville landmark and is listed on the National Register of Historic Places.

== Architecture ==
The church is built from Crab Orchard sandstone and has a slate roof. A prominent feature of the building is a large entrance tower. The original sanctuary and church school wing are arranged around a central courtyard, which is accessed through a series of pointed arch entranceways.

The sanctuary features stained glass windows designed and manufactured by Charles J. Connick of Boston. Stained glass from Connick's studio is seen in many other American churches from the 20th century, including St. Patrick's Cathedral and the Cathedral of St. John the Divine in New York City, St. John's Cathedral in Denver, Fourth Presbyterian Church in Chicago, Grace Cathedral in San Francisco, and University Chapel at Princeton University.

== History ==
=== Previous buildings ===
The Church Street Methodist congregation formed in 1816. Initially, it met in a house on Hill Avenue in downtown Knoxville. In 1836 the congregation moved into a new building on Church Street between Walnut and Market Streets, where it met until 1863 when the building was confiscated by Union troops for use as a hospital during the American Civil War. Around 1870, the congregation relocated to a brick building one block east of its former location on Church Street.

In 1879 it moved into its new Victorian Gothic church building erected on its former 410 Church Street location. Some say this building was designed by Knoxville architect Alexander Campbell Bruce. Planning to replace that church building began in 1921 when the congregation recognized a need for a larger facility to accommodate its growth, but little progress had been made as of February 1928, when a fire destroyed the building on Church Street.

=== Construction ===
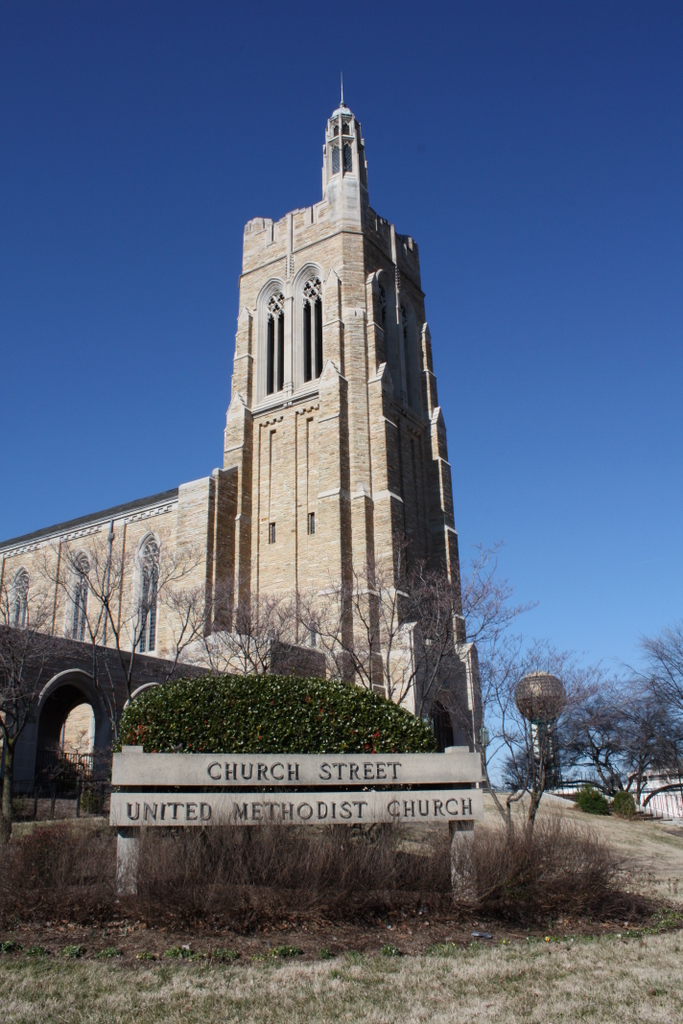
The church tower in 2009

The congregation then acquired the Henley Street site to construct a new, larger church building. In the move to Henley Street, the church retained its old name of Church Street Methodist Episcopal Church, South. (In 1939, it became Church Street Methodist Church.)

The congregation decided to retain the Gothic Revival architectural style for its new building. Architect John Russell Pope of New York City was hired to design the new facility, in cooperation with local architect Charles I. Barber of the Knoxville firm of Barber & McMurry. The design was similar to several other Gothic Revival buildings that Pope's firm had designed, including buildings on the Yale University campus and churches in Larchmont and New Rochelle, New York, and Columbus, Ohio. Construction of the new building began in March 1930 and was completed the following year, with the first worship service held in January 1931.

=== Later history ===
On Labor Day 1940, with his campaign for a third term beginning, President Franklin D. Roosevelt was driven past the church en route to Newfound Gap to dedicate the Great Smoky Mountains National Park. He reportedly inquired about the church and remarked, "That is the most beautiful church I have ever seen."

The congregation made additions behind the original building in 1964, when a new education building was built, and in 1986–1989, when the Church Life Building was built. The additions used the same exterior building materials as the 1930 building, have minimal attachment to the original building, and are considered "sympathetic" to the original design.

In 2009, the church building was listed on the National Register of Historic Places. The National Register listing recognizes the building for its architecture and its stained glass.
