= Knoxville High School (Tennessee) =

- U.S. Historic district – Contributing property
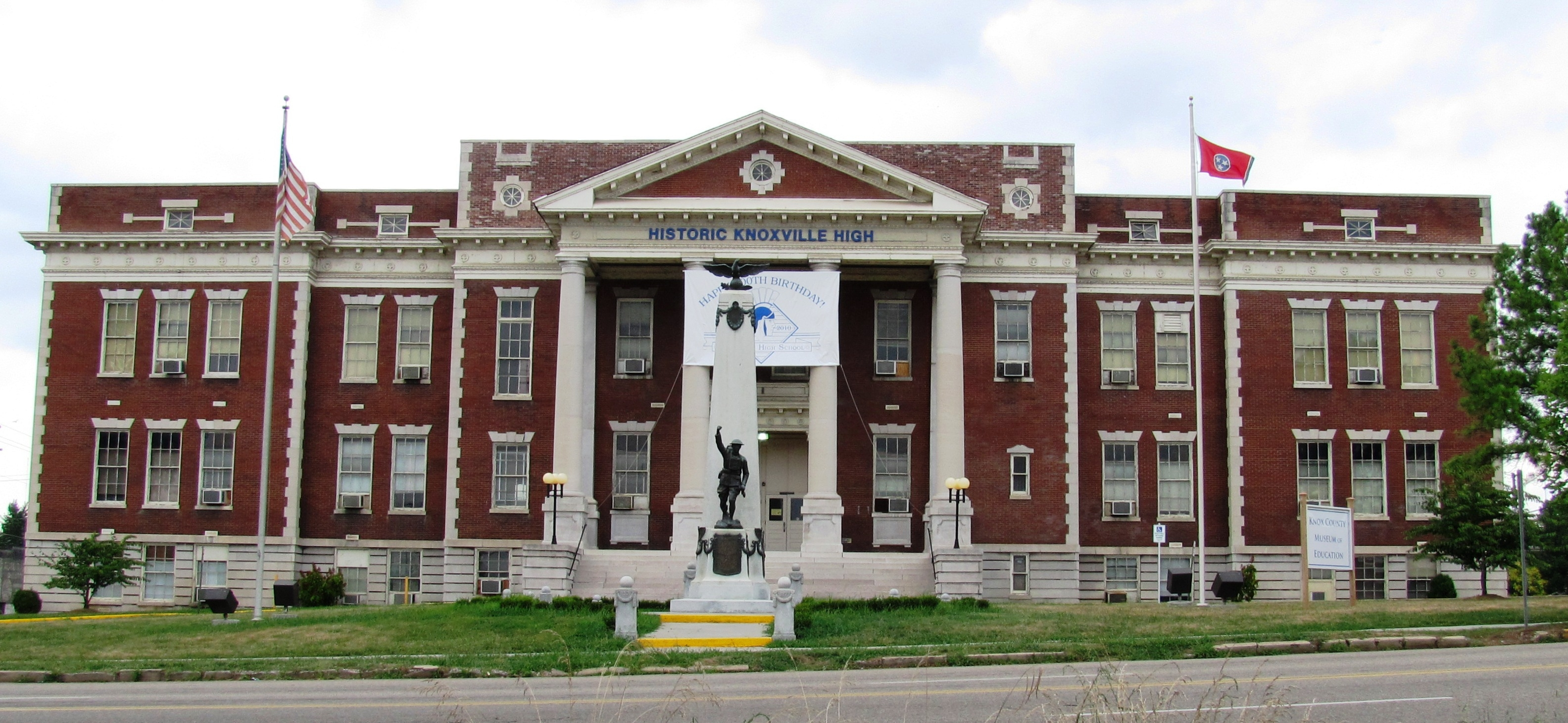
- Knoxville High School
- Location: Knoxville, Tennessee
- Built: ca. 1910
- Architect: Albert Baumann Sr.
- Architectural style: Neoclassical Revival
- Part of: Emory Place Historic District (ID94001259)
- Designated CP: November 10, 1994

Knoxville High School was a public high school in Knoxville, Tennessee, United States, that operated from 1910 to 1951, enrolling grades 10 to 12. Its building is a contributing property in the Emory Place Historic District, which is listed on the National Register of Historic Places. The building was more recently used for adult education programs offered by Knox County Schools.

The building is currently being converted into senior assisted living

== History ==
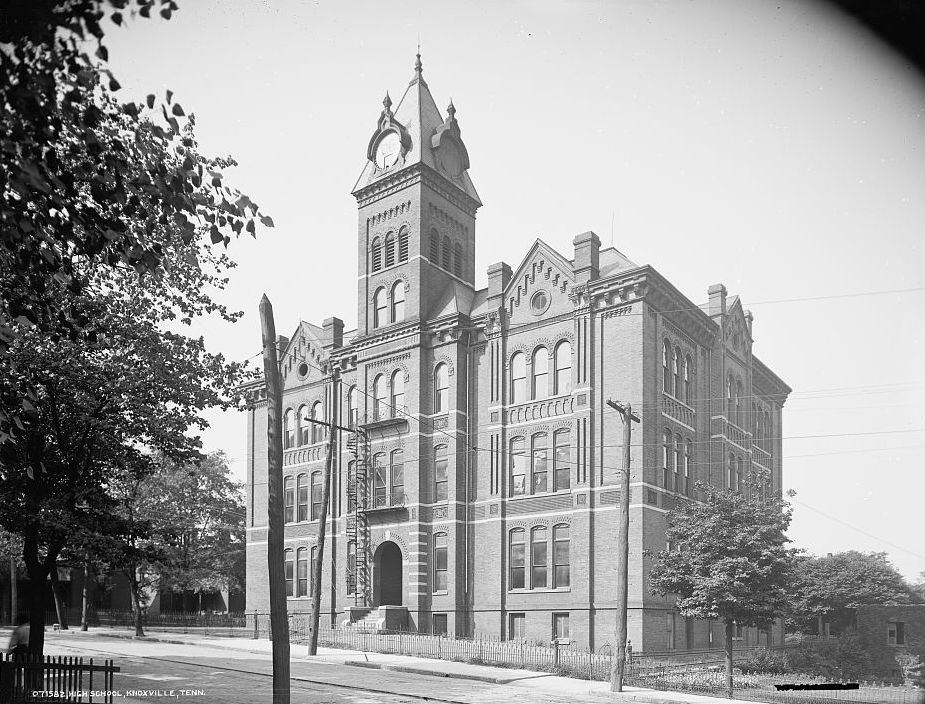
The old Girls' High School, where Knoxville's female students attended high school before the opening of Knoxville High

The Knoxville High School building, located on East Fifth Avenue in Knoxville, was completed in 1910, enrolling male and female students who had previously attended separate high schools. W. J. Barton was the school's first principal. W. E. Evans served as principal from 1917 until the school closed in 1951. Enrollment grew to just over 2,000 in the early 1920s and reached a peak of about 2,300 around the beginning of World War II.

The school was known for many years as a school sports powerhouse, winning a total of 13 Tennessee state championships and six Southern championships in football, as well as national championships in 1930 and 1937.

By 1948, the building had become inadequate, and city schools Superintendent Tom Prince warned that the Southern Association of Colleges and Secondary Schools was threatening to strip Knoxville High's accreditation. In response, the city built three new schools: Fulton High School, West High School, East High School, and made improvements to South High School and Austin High. Knoxville High closed in 1951.

After the school was closed, the city school district used the building for administrative offices. Following consolidation of the city and county schools, Knox County Schools has used the building for adult education.

== Building ==
The original Knoxville High School building was designed in a classical revival style by Knoxville architect Albert Baumann Sr., who also designed the Knoxville Post Office and Federal Building, the Andrew Johnson Hotel, and the Cherokee Country Club, as well as some of the city's early-20th-century Victorian homes. The building was expanded in both 1914 and 1920 to accommodate increased enrollment.

The building is included in the Emory Place Historic District, which was listed on the National Register of Historic Places on November 10, 1994. Knox Heritage, a local historic preservation organization, included it on its 2010 "Fragile Fifteen" list of endangered historic properties due to concerns about its ongoing maintenance. A World War I monument, erected in 1921, stands on the school's front lawn.

== Conversion to Senior Housing ==
In 2015, Knoxville High went under renovation as Dover Development began the process of converting the former school building into a senior housing campus. The renovation took 3 years with the grand opening taking place in 2018.

== Notable people ==
- Mary S. Cummins, principal and teacher at Knoxville High School

== Notable alumni ==
Notable people who attended Knoxville High School include the following:

- James Agee, Pulitzer Prize-winning author of A Death in the Family
- Tommy Bartlett, collegiate athlete and coach in both basketball and tennis
- Edward Boling, president of the University of Tennessee from 1970 to 1986
- Harvey Broome, lawyer who helped to found the Great Smoky Mountains National Park and is the namesake of the Knoxville chapter of the Sierra Club
- Clarence Brown, film director
- Mary Costa, professional opera singer and actress, who is best known for providing the voice of Princess Aurora in Walt Disney's Sleeping Beauty (1959 film).
- Jerome Courtland, actor who starred in several Walt Disney films and shows
- John Cullum, actor and singer
- Charles "Chili" Dean, chairman of the Tennessee Valley Authority board from 1988 to 1990
- Roddie Edmonds, Righteous Among the Nations—Master Sergeant, United States Army during World War II who as a POW saved more than 200 Jewish American soldiers
- Norman C. Gaddis, United States Air Force general who was a POW during the Vietnam War
- Guilford Glazer, industrialist, real estate developer, and philanthropist
- David Madden, novelist.
- Robert Monroe, United States Navy vice admiral who commanded the Atlantic fleet
- Patricia Neal, award-winning actress
- Sara O'Meara, actress and founder of the organization Childhelp
- Robert Rochelle, invented the Vanguard satellite communications system
- Kyle Testerman, mayor of Knoxville in the 1970s and 1980s
- Pug Vaughan, football player
- John Ward, longtime announcer for Tennessee Volunteers football and basketball
- Maurice F. Weisner, 4-star Admiral, Commander-in-Chief U.S. Pacific Forces
