= White Lily =

Flour brand

White Lily is an American brand of all-purpose flour owned by the Hometown Food Company.

== History ==
White Lily was created by J. Allen Smith in Knoxville, Tennessee in 1883, and named after his wife, Lillie. Since Sunday dinner was a special occasion, bakers sometimes reserved its use specifically for that purpose, so it became known to some as the Sunday flour. It is a weak flour, containing 9% protein, which brings it closer to a pastry flour, producing lighter and fluffier biscuits. White Lily only uses the endosperm of flour grains, which is then bleached in chlorine, which both whitens the flour and weakens the proteins. Bags of White Lily are taller than most flour bags, as it weighs less per cup than standard all purpose flour due to using soft red winter wheat, which was once mostly grown in Georgia, South Carolina, North Carolina, and Tennessee. In 2018, it was difficult to find north of Washington, D.C. but was more readily available as far west as Seattle, Washington and San Jose, California in 2020 during the COVID-19 pandemic, possibly due to the company expanding retail operations with the loss of customers in the food industry.

The J.M. Smucker Company bought the brand in 2006, shutting down the Knoxville mill in 2007 and moving production to two mills in the midwestern United States in 2008. The brand was sold to the Hometown Food Company in 2018.
