= Dolly Parton Children's Hospital =

- Shown in Tennessee

Geography
- Location: Knoxville, Tennessee, United States
- Coordinates: 35.956°N 83.938°W

Organization
- Care system: Private, Independent, Not-For-Profit
- Type: Specialty, Pediatrics
- Affiliated university: University of Tennessee Health Science Center

Services
- Emergency department: Level II Pediatric Trauma Center
- Beds: 152

History
- Founded: 1937

Links
- Website: www.dollychildrens.org
- Lists: Hospitals in Tennessee

Dolly Parton Children's Hospital (also referred to as Dolly Children's, and formerly known as East Tennessee Children's Hospital) is a private, independent, not-for-profit, 152-bed pediatric medical center in Knoxville, Tennessee. The hospital's primary service area includes 16 counties in East Tennessee, and its secondary service area includes counties in southwest Virginia, southeast Kentucky and western North Carolina.

It is certified by the state as a Comprehensive Regional Pediatric Center (CRPC), Tennessee's highest level of certification for pediatric hospital care. The hospital is accredited by the Joint Commission for the Accreditation of Healthcare Organizations and is a member of Child Health Corporation of America, Hospital Alliance of Tennessee, Children's Hospital Alliance of Tennessee, Tennessee Hospital Association and National Association of Children's Hospitals and Related Institutions (NACHRI).

The hospital and its affiliates, including numerous pediatric physician practices, employ about 1,800 individuals in full-time, part-time and as-needed positions.

== History ==
Opening in 1937, the 28-bed facility at 1912 Laurel Avenue was known as the Knox County Crippled Children's Hospital, and its primary purpose was to care for children with polio. In the 1940s, because of admissions from outside Knox County, officials changed the name of the hospital to East Tennessee Crippled Children's Hospital, open to children birth through 21 years with any type of illness.

Because of the advent of antibiotics and the polio vaccine, the need for specialized orthopedic services diminished. Because of this, the hospital was officially renamed East Tennessee Children's Hospital in 1955 and began to focus on all pediatric illnesses and injuries.

In 1970, a new facility with 74 beds opened at the hospital's current location, 2018 Clinch Avenue, a few blocks from the original location. In 1975, the number of beds increased from 74 to 96 with the completion of a 22-bed fourth floor. Later in 1975, the addition of an Intensive Care Nursery increased total beds at East Tennessee Children's Hospital to 122.

A 10,000-square-foot (930 m^{2}) emergency department was completed in 1981, and a five-story medical office building was added in 1986. Additional facility expansions—without a change in total patient beds—took place in 1988, 1993, 1994 and 2001.

The hospital constructed two parking garages, the first in 1993 (now used for patient and physician parking) and the second in 2001 (for employee parking).

In 1999, a new three-story hospital office building, Children's Plaza, opened. It was renamed in 2001 to honor longtime hospital president Bob Koppel on the 25th anniversary of his presidency. This building was expanded in 2003, more than doubling in size.

In 2001 Children's Hospital received state approval to begin development of Children's West, an outpatient campus in West Knoxville. The campus now is home to the Children's West Surgery Center (a day surgery center that opened in 2003) and Children's Hospital Rehabilitation Center, which relocated from its former site in 2004. Also in 2001 Children's Hospital announced plans for a major expansion and renovation project on the main campus. The project included a new seven-story patient tower, a third-floor addition over the existing Emergency Department and renovation of much of the existing facility, including renovation of all semi-private patient rooms into private rooms with full baths. Children's Hospital's $31.8 million expansion project was completed in 2005. When the project began, Children's Hospital was a 169,700-square-foot, 122-bed facility; the hospital now has 285,500 square feet (26,520 m^{2}) of space and 152 licensed beds.

In January 2004, Children's Hospital provided care in the Neonatal Intensive Care Unit for Tennessee's first surviving quintuplets, the van Tols: Willem Scott, Sean Conner, Isabella Marie, Ashley Faith and Meghan Ann.

On February 26, 2026, the hospital announced that it would be renamed after singer-songwriter Dolly Parton.

== Services ==
Dolly Parton Children's Hospital offers 29 subspecialties (with more than 90 pediatric subspecialists). Children made more than 155,000 visits to Children's Hospital in the 2007-08 fiscal year, which ended June 30, 2008.

Children's Hospital provides the following services:

- Treatment for acute illnesses and injuries in the 24-hour Emergency Department.
- Care for critically ill and injured patients in the Goody's Pediatric Intensive Care Unit (PICU).
- Board-certified neonatologists in the 44-bed Haslam Family Neonatal Intensive Care Unit (NICU), which specializes in the care of critically ill or premature newborns.
- A pediatric transport service for critically ill and injured newborns and pediatric patients. As a regional referral center for East Tennessee, Children's Hospital transports children from outlying hospitals in LIFELINE, a mobile intensive care unit.
- Diagnostic services including: Clinical Lab, Gastroenterology, Neurology, Pulmonary Function, Radiology, Ultrasound, MRI and CT Scan.
- Outpatient clinics for: cystic fibrosis, diabetes, cancer, blood diseases, arthritis, infectious diseases, Weight Management and metabolic diseases.
- Additional services including Children's Hospital Rehabilitation Center (including an indoor therapy pool and a medical day treatment program), Home Health Care Department, Child Life, Pastoral Care, Social Work and Interpretation/Translation Services.

Pediatric subspecialties

- Adolescent gynecology
- Adolescent medicine
- Neonatology
- Pediatric allergy and immunology
- Pediatric anesthesiology
- Pediatric cardiology
- Pediatric critical care
- Pediatric dentistry/pedodontics
- Pediatric dermatology
- Pediatric emergency medicine
- Pediatric endocrinology
- Pediatric gastroenterology
- Pediatric Hematology and Oncology
- Pediatric infectious disease
- Pediatric nephrology
- Pediatric neurology
- Pediatric neurosurgery
- Pediatric ophthalmology
- Pediatric orthopedics
- Pediatric otolaryngology
- Pediatric physiatry
- Pediatric plastic/reconstructive surgery
- Pediatric psychology
- Pediatric pulmonology
- Pediatric radiology
- Pediatric surgery
- Pediatric urology
- Perinatology
- Rheumatology

== Community involvement ==
=== Knox County School System ===
Children's Hospital participates in the Knox County School System's Partners in Education program. The hospital's "adopted" schools are Karns Elementary School, Cedar Bluff Intermediate School and Fort Sanders Educational Development Center.

The Child Life Department at Children's Hospital and volunteers provide the "Hello Hospital" program to kindergarten classes in all Knox County elementary schools. "Hello Hospital" is designed to teach young children what it is like to visit a hospital.

=== Community organization involvement ===
In the fall of 2008, Children's Hospital launched the community-wide Knoxville Area Coalition on Childhood Obesity to increase awareness of problems of childhood obesity, begin a community assessment of current initiatives and introduce the concept of a community coalition using the National Institutes of Health's We Can! (Ways to Enhance Children's Activity and Nutrition) program.

In the summer of 2008, Children's Hospital became the lead organization for Safe Kids of the Greater Knox Area. The mission of the local Safe Kids coalition is to reduce unintentional injuries in children up to age 14 in the East Tennessee region by promoting awareness and implementing prevention initiatives. The local Safe Kids is part of Safe Kids USA, the United States division of Safe Kids Worldwide.

Children's Hospital provides staff, volunteers, in-kind services (such as meeting space) and/or financial support to many community organizations whose goals are to improve the lives of children, including American Cancer Society, American Heart Association, CoverKids, CureFinders, Cystic Fibrosis Foundation, Down Syndrome Awareness Group, Dream Connection, Girls on the Run, Juvenile Diabetes Research Foundation, Knox County Health Department, Knox County Schools' Partners in Education, Knoxville Area Pregnancy Prevention Initiative, Knoxville Police Department's Safety City, Knoxville Police Department's Think Fast Alcohol Awareness Program, Leukemia and Lymphoma Society, March of Dimes, Montgomery Village, Smoke-Free Knoxville, TENNder Care Coalition and United Way.

=== Health care education ===
Children's Hospital offers student internships, externships, nursing scholarships and training programs for student nurses, pre-med students, social work students, child development specialists and others pursuing health care as a career.

Children's Hospital works with the University of Tennessee Medical Center and University of Tennessee College of Medicine to provide medical school rotations in family practice and other specialties. The hospital also is the pediatric clinical training site for student nurses, respiratory therapists, radiology students and students in other health care disciplines.

Children's Hospital is an accredited Continuing Medical Education provider in Tennessee.

Children's Hospital sponsors the Healthy Kids Community Education Program to provide classes for non-health care professionals. Programs include the American Heart Association's CPR Certification Program and Safe Sitter.

=== Fantasy of Trees ===
Since 1985, the Fantasy of Trees, an annual holiday event with activities and entertainment for families, has raised nearly $4.7 million for the hospital and hosted over a million visitors. Volunteers donate over 155,000 hours annually to support Fantasy of Trees.

== See also ==
- Children's Miracle Network
- Dance Marathon
- Ronald McDonald House Charities
- Joint Commission
