= Baumann family (architects) =

American architect

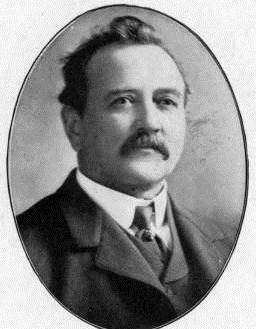
Joseph F. Baumann

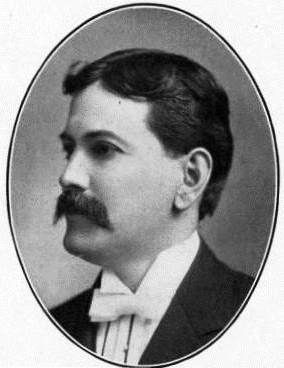
Albert B. Baumann, Sr.

The Baumann family was a family of American architects who practiced in Knoxville, Tennessee, and the surrounding region, in the late 19th and early 20th centuries. It included Joseph F. Baumann (1844–1920), his brother, Albert B. Baumann, Sr. (1861–1942), and Albert's son, Albert B. Baumann, Jr. (1897–1952). Buildings designed by the Baumanns include the Mall Building (1875), the Church of the Immaculate Conception (1886), Minvilla (1913), the Andrew Johnson Building (1930), and the Knoxville Post Office (1934).

Joseph Baumann, the son of a carpenter, began working as an architect in Knoxville in 1872, when he designed the city's first opera house, Staub's Theatre. In 1887, his brother, Albert, became a full partner in the firm, which then began operating under the name, Baumann Brothers. Joseph left the firm in 1913, and Albert worked alone until 1922, when his son joined the firm, which then changed its name to Baumann and Baumann. The firm continued working under different partners following the death of Albert Baumann, Jr., in 1952. It currently operates as Kaatz Binkley Jones and Morris (KBJM).

The Baumanns have been called Knoxville's first architectural "dynasty." They designed many of the major buildings constructed in the city during the late 19th century. Several of their works, which range from downtown high-rises to suburban cottages, have been listed on the National Register of Historic Places.

== History ==
William Baumann, the father of Joseph and Albert Baumann, Sr., was born in Kirchheimbolanden, Germany, and immigrated to America in the 1830s. In 1837, he married Catherine Schneider. The family briefly lived in Savannah, Georgia, where Baumann worked as a shipbuilder. By the 1840s, the family had moved to East Tennessee, where Baumann found ample work as a carpenter and house builder in various growing towns around the region. The Baumanns moved to Knoxville in 1855.

During the Civil War, the Baumann house, located on what was then the outskirts of town, was occupied by both Union and Confederate soldiers, and suffered considerable damage. Some of the Baumann children were sent to Charleston, Tennessee, to stay with family friends, while remaining family members hid out in the Second Presbyterian Church. After the war, Baumann and his sons continued working as carpenters, and helped to rebuild Knoxville.

=== Joseph Baumann, 1872–1887 ===
Joseph Francis Baumann, the second son of William and Catherine Baumann, was born in Tellico Plains, Tennessee, on January 16, 1844. He initially worked in the carpentry trade alongside his father, but began listing his services as an architect in 1872. That year, he designed two important Knoxville landmarks, the Second Empire home of financier Charles McClung McGhee on Locust Street, and Staub's Theatre, the city's first opera house, on Gay Street.

In 1875, Baumann designed Odd Fellows Hall (now called the Mall Building, or Hotel St. Oliver) for confectioner Peter Kern, as well as the Third Presbyterian Church, of which the Baumanns were members. Other major commissions during this period included the Hattie House Hotel (1879), the East Tennessee National Bank (1886), and large mansions for businessmen such as C. J. McClung and James D. Cowan. One of Baumann's most well-known projects, the Church of the Immaculate Conception, was completed atop Summit Hill in 1886.

=== Baumann Brothers, 1887–1913 ===
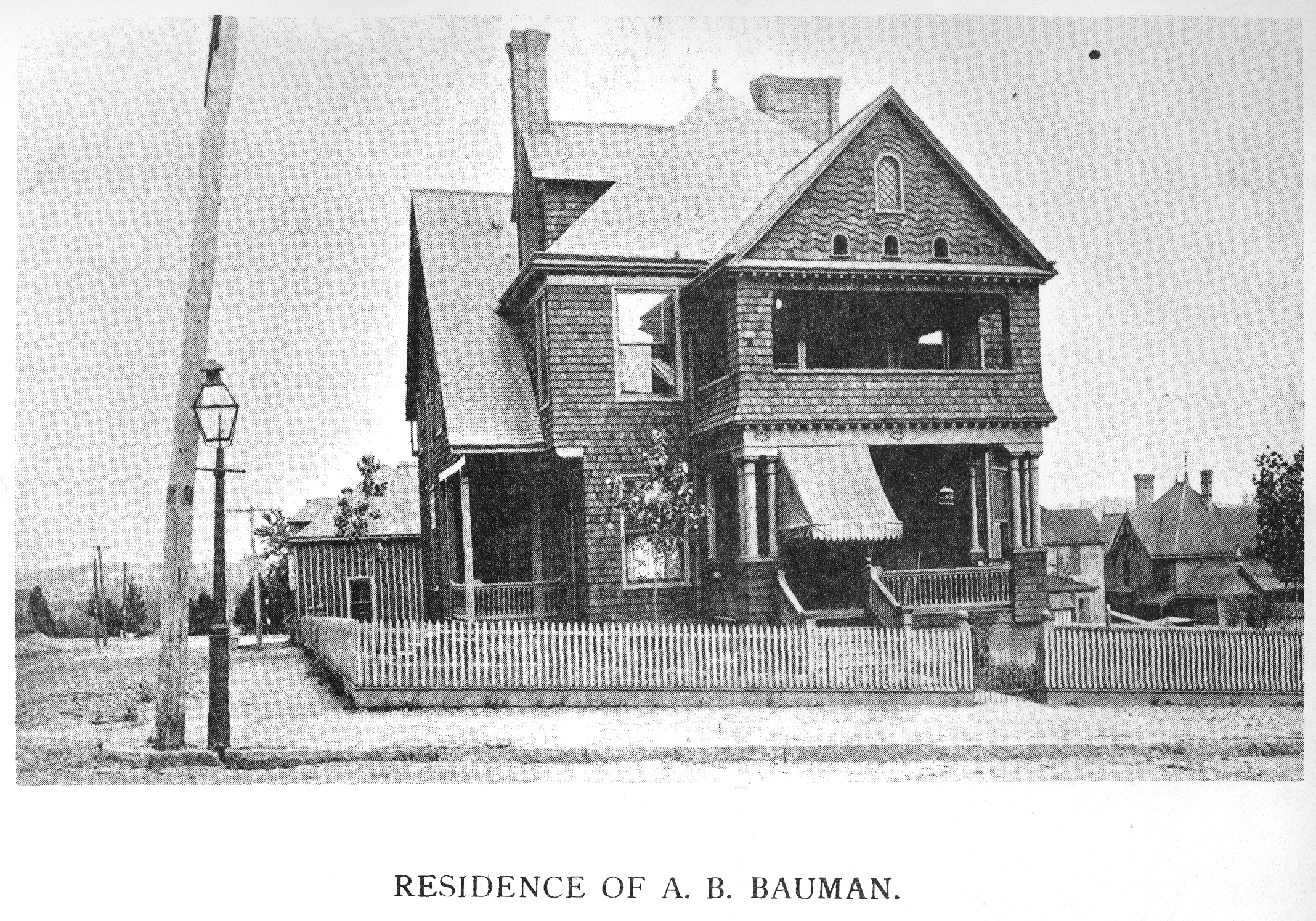
N. Fourth Ave. and Caswell St., Knoxville, ca. 1895

Joseph Baumann's younger brother, Albert Benjamin Baumann, was born in Knoxville on August 30, 1861. He joined Joseph's firm as a draftsman in 1882, and upon his promotion to full partner in 1887, the firm began operating under the name, "Baumann Brothers." This firm's early work included several large warehouses with ornamented storefronts on Jackson Avenue, campus buildings for the Holbrook Normal College and Baker-Himel School, and elaborate houses, such as Westwood on Kingston Pike and Park Place in Fountain City.

In the 1880s, Joseph Baumann helped renovate and expand Knoxville's first Market House, a one-story shed-like structure which occupied much of Market Square. The Baumanns subsequently designed an imposing two-story replacement for this building, which was completed in 1897. That same year, the Monroe County Courthouse in Madisonville was completed, one of several courthouses designed by the Baumanns. Later courthouses included the Blount County Courthouse (1906) in Maryville and the Washington County Courthouse (1912) in Jonesborough.

Joseph Baumann left the firm in 1913, and retired from the profession altogether in 1916. He died on April 20, 1920. Albert continued as the firm's sole principal for several years. His commissions included the expansion of Knoxville High School, the original design of which he had provided in 1910. He also remodeled the Charles McClung McGhee House (which had been one of his brother's first commissions in 1872) as a Masonic Temple in 1915.

=== Baumann and Baumann, 1922–1952 ===
Albert's son, Albert "A.B." Baumann, Jr., was born in Knoxville on January 20, 1897. He studied architecture at the University of Pennsylvania under French-born architect Paul Cret, who is credited with spreading the Beaux-Arts style in America (Baumann's chief competitors, Charles I. Barber and Benjamin McMurry, also studied under Cret). In 1922, Albert, Jr., joined his father's firm, which then began operating under the name, "Baumann and Baumann."

One of Baumann and Baumann's largest projects was the Andrew Johnson Hotel, which was built in the late 1920s, and would remain Knoxville's tallest building for several decades. Another major undertaking was the U.S. Post Office (1934) on Main Street, a large neoclassical structure influenced by post office buildings designed by Paul Cret during the same period. The Baumanns designed several major schools for the county, including Park City Junior High (1927), Tyson Junior High (1936), and Central High School (now Gresham Middle School) and Fountain City Elementary School in 1931. All four still stand, and the latter two are still used as schools.

Albert Baumann, Sr., died on November 23, 1942, and Albert Baumann, Jr., died on September 19, 1952. Both are buried in Highland Memorial Cemetery. Joseph Baumann is buried in Old Gray Cemetery. Wallace Baumann, the son of Albert Baumann, Jr., remained active in Knoxville as a local historian until his death in 2009. KBJM, the successor to the Baumann firm, is currently based in Mt. Juliet, Tennessee.

== Works ==
Several hundred structures in Knoxville alone have been attributed to Baumanns' firms. Over a dozen of these structures have been listed on the National Register of Historic Places, the most recent listing being Minvilla in 2010. Along with their architectural services, the Baumanns also supervised the construction of several notable Knoxville buildings, including the Knox County Courthouse and St. John's Cathedral (designed by J. W. Yost).

Joseph Baumann read trade magazines such as Inland Architecture and National Builder, and frequently attended American Institute of Architects conventions, and was thus aware of the changes taking place in architecture during the 1880s and 1890s. His early designs were typically in the Second Empire and Early English Gothic styles. By the mid-1880s, however, he had transitioned to the more contemporary Victorian Gothic and Queen Anne styles.

=== List of works ===
==== Key ====
Designed by Joseph F. Baumann, 1872–1887

Designed by Baumann Brothers (Joseph F. Baumann and/or Albert Baumann, Sr.), 1887–1913

Designed by Baumann and Baumann, 1922–1952

- NRHP – Listed on the National Register of Historic Places, reference number given for individual listings, historic district given for contributing properties
- HABS – Documented by the Historic American Buildings Survey
- R – Remodeled by the Baumanns, with remodeling date given in the "Completed" column

Completed Works table
Name	Location	Completed	Status	Other information	Image	Reference
Charles McClung McGhee House (Locust St.)	Knoxville, Tennessee	1872	Altered	Exterior drastically modified by Albert Baumann, Sr., as a temple for the local Masons in 1915		
Staub's Theatre (Gay St.)	Knoxville, Tennessee	1872	Demolished	Knoxville's first opera house; designed for Swiss-born entrepreneur Peter Staub		
Peabody School (Morgan St.)	Knoxville, Tennessee	1874	Altered			
Mall Building (Market Square)	Knoxville, Tennessee	1875	Standing	NRHP (#82003983); also called "Kern Building" or "Odd Fellows Hall"; currently Hotel St. Oliver		
C.J. McClung House (Main St.)	Knoxville, Tennessee	1876	Demolished	Norman-style house with mansard roof		
Third Presbyterian Church (5th Ave.)	Knoxville, Tennessee	1877	Demolished	Later the Fifth Avenue Presbyterian Church		
Hattie House (Gay St.)	Knoxville, Tennessee	1879	Burned	Remodeled as Imperial Hotel in 1894, burned 1916; rebuilt as Farragut Hotel		
Maury Academy	Dandridge, Tennessee	1884	Demolished	Became Maury High School in 1910, replaced by current building in late 1920s		
Church of the Immaculate Conception (W. Vine Ave.)	Knoxville, Tennessee	1886	Standing	Built for Knoxville's first Catholic congregation; Victorian Gothic style		
East Tennessee National Bank (Gay St. and Union Ave., southwest corner)	Knoxville, Tennessee	1886	Demolished			
First Baptist Church (Gay St.)	Knoxville, Tennessee	1886	Demolished	Building demolished in the 1920s when the congregation moved to a new location on Main Street		
Girls High School	Knoxville, Tennessee	1886	Demolished			
Fourth Presbyterian Church (Glenwood Ave.)	Knoxville, Tennessee	1887	Demolished	Gothic Revival-style church		
Broad Street Methodist Church (Broadway)	Knoxville, Tennessee	1887	Burned			
Third National Bank (Gay St.)	Knoxville, Tennessee	1887	Burned			
Lockett Building (W. Jackson Ave.)	Knoxville, Tennessee	1889	Demolished	HABS (TN-212)		
Park Place (Broadway)	Knoxville, Tennessee	1890	Demolished	HABS (TN-240); this house once stood at the intersection of Broadway and Cedar in Fountain City		
Westwood (Kingston Pike)	Knoxville, Tennessee	1890	Standing	NRHP (#84000366)		
Borches Block (Gay St.)	Knoxville, Tennessee	1890	Demolished	Richardsonian Romanesque-style commercial block		
Lenoir City Company office (Depot St.)	Lenoir City, Tennessee	1890	Standing	NRHP (#82003987); currently home to the Lenoir City Museum		
New Providence Presbyterian Church	Maryville, Tennessee	1892	Demolished	Replaced by the current church building in the early 1950s		
Baumann cottage (839 Deery St.)	Knoxville, Tennessee	1893	Standing	NRHP contributing property (Fourth and Gill Historic District); designed for the Baumanns' siblings		
Holbrook Normal College	Knoxville, Tennessee	1894	Demolished	Replaced by current Gresham Middle School in 1931		
Albert B. Baumann House	Knoxville, Tennessee	1895 (appx.)	Standing	Modified		
Market House (Market Square)	Knoxville, Tennessee	1897	Demolished	Removed in 1960, replaced by Market Square Mall		
Monroe County Courthouse	Madisonville, Tennessee	1897	Standing	NRHP (#95000341)		
Woman's Building (Main St.)	Knoxville, Tennessee	1897	Burned	Built for the Tennessee Centennial Exposition in Nashville, where it was known as the "Knoxville Building"; moved to Knoxville after the exposition and renamed "Woman's Building"		
Fayerweather Science Building (Maryville College)	Maryville, Tennessee	1898	Burned; rebuilt 2001	NRHP contributing property (Maryville College Historic District)		
Carhart Building (W. Jackson Ave.)	Knoxville, Tennessee	1900 (appx.)	Standing	NRHP contributing property (Southern Terminal and Warehouse Historic District); HABS (TN-212)		
125–127 West Jackson	Knoxville, Tennessee	1900 (appx.)	Standing	NRHP contributing property (Southern Terminal and Warehouse Historic District); HABS (TN-212); 127 built c. 1900; 125 built before 1886, remodeled to match 127 c. 1900		
Blount County Courthouse	Maryville, Tennessee	1906	Standing	Neoclassical-style courthouse		
Union Soldier Monument	Knoxville, Tennessee	1906	Standing	Part of NRHP-listed Knoxville National Cemetery		
Knoxville High School (5th Ave.)	Knoxville, Tennessee	1910	Standing	NRHP contributing property (Emory Place Historic District); school closed in 1951		
Washington County Courthouse	Jonesborough, Tennessee	1912	Standing	NRHP contributing property (Jonesboro Historic District)		
Glenwood School (Brownlow School) (Luttrell St.)	Knoxville, Tennessee	1913	Altered	Remodeled with addition c. 1926 by Barber & McMurry. School closed 1990s. Now Brownlow Lofts.		
Minvilla (Broadway)	Knoxville, Tennessee	1913	Standing	NRHP (#10001046); Renovated as 5th Avenue Motel c. 1950s, restored to original appearance 2000s		
DeGroat House (935 Eleanor St.)	Knoxville, Tennessee	1915	Standing	NRHP contributing property (Fourth and Gill Historic District); designed for a cousin		
Knoxville Masonic Temple (Locust St.) (R)	Knoxville, Tennessee	1915	Standing	Originally built in 1872 and designed by Joseph Baumann; remodeled as Masonic Temple by Albert B. Baumann, Sr., 1915		
631 Scenic Drive	Knoxville, Tennessee	1927	Standing	Late-1920s and early-1930s development in Sequoyah Hills		
Central United Methodist Church (3rd Ave.)	Knoxville, Tennessee	1927	Standing	NRHP (#05001225)		
Benjamin Morton House (Kingston Pike)	Knoxville, Tennessee	1927	Standing	NRHP (#04001233)		
Park City Junior High	Knoxville, Tennessee	1927	Standing	NRHP (#83003045); remodeled as Park Place condominiums by Kristopher Kendrick		
Cherokee Country Club (Lyons View Pike)	Knoxville, Tennessee	1928	Standing			
Fidelity Building (Gay St.) (R)	Knoxville, Tennessee	1929	Standing	NRHP (#84003566, listed as Cowan, McClung and Company Building); originally constructed 1871, remodeled 1929		
Andrew Johnson Hotel (Gay St.)	Knoxville, Tennessee	1930	Standing	NRHP (#80003840)		
Park City Branch Library	Knoxville, Tennessee	1930	Standing			
806 Scenic Drive	Knoxville, Tennessee	1931	Standing	Late-1920s and early 1930s development in Sequoyah Hills		
Fountain City Elementary	Knoxville, Tennessee	1931	Standing	Still in use as an elementary school		
Gresham Middle School	Knoxville, Tennessee	1931	Standing	Originally Central High School, became middle school in 1971		
Lockett House (1065 Scenic Dr.)	Knoxville, Tennessee	1931	Standing	Late-1920s and early 1930s development in Sequoyah Hills		
Appalachian Clubhouse	Elkmont, Tennessee	1934	Standing	NRHP contributing property (Elkmont Historic District)		
Knoxville Post Office (Main St.)	Knoxville, Tennessee	1934	Standing	NRHP (#84003567)		
Tyson Junior High School (Kingston Pike)	Knoxville, Tennessee	1936	Standing	NRHP (#98000821)		
Arlington Church of Christ	Knoxville, Tennessee	1948	Standing			
Smithwood School	Knoxville, Tennessee	1950	Standing			
Tennessee Supreme Court Building (Cumberland Ave.)	Knoxville, Tennessee	1951	Standing			

== See also ==
- George Franklin Barber
- Thomas Hope
- Bruce McCarty
