= Benjamin Morton House =

Historic house in Tennessee, United States

- U.S. National Register of Historic Places
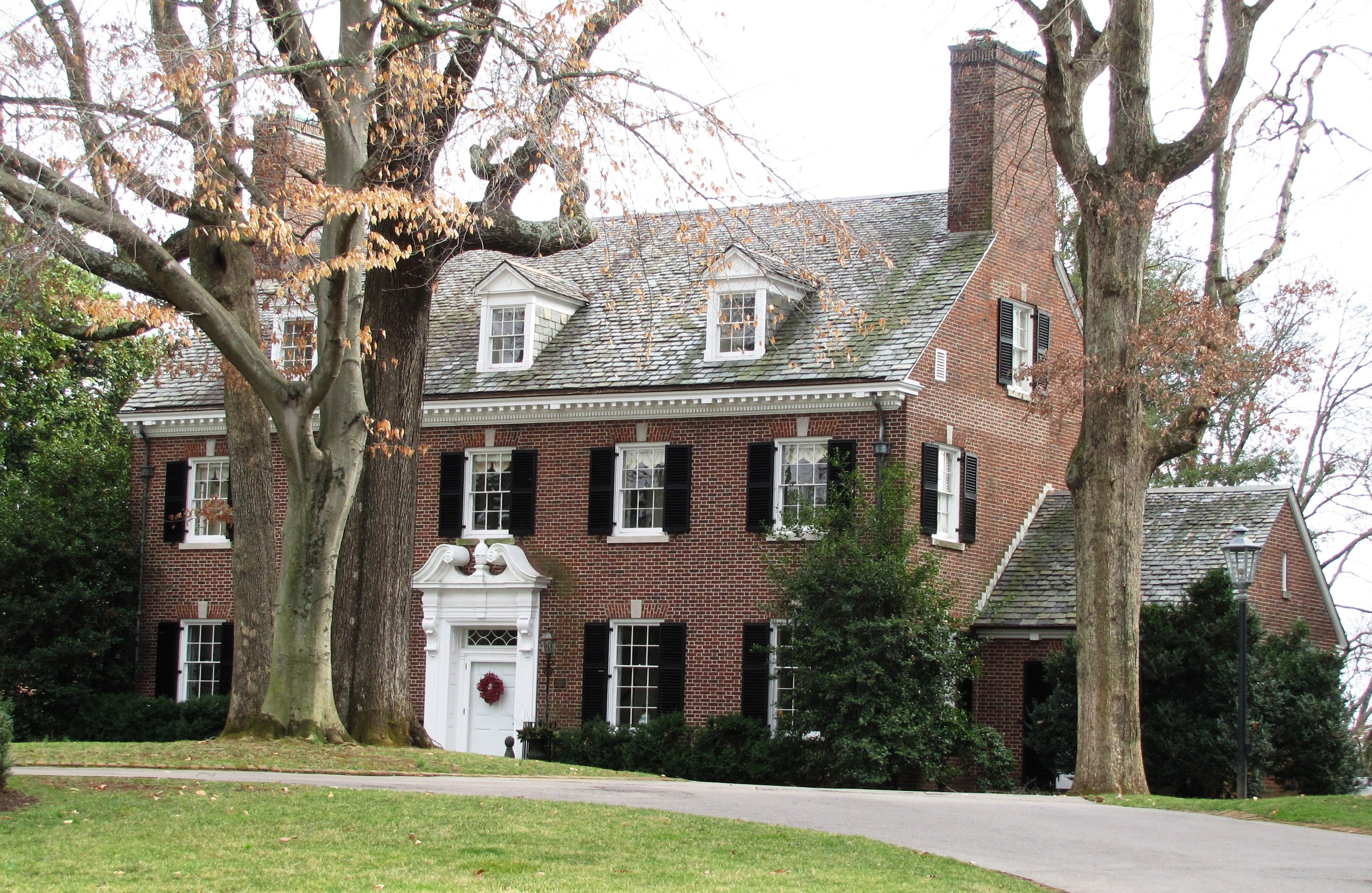
- Location: 4084 Kingston Pike; Knoxville, Tennessee
- Coordinates: 35°56′35.5″N 83°58′21.5″W
- Built: 1927
- Architect: Baumann and Baumann
- Architectural style: Colonial Revival
- MPS: Knoxville and Knox County MPS
- NRHP reference No.: 04001233
- Added to NRHP: November 10, 2004

The Benjamin Morton House, also known as the Morton-Bush House, is a historic brick home located at 4084 Kingston Pike in Knoxville, Tennessee, United States.

It was constructed in 1927, and designed in the Colonial Revival style by the noted Knoxville architectural firm, Baumann and Baumann. The residence carries the name of its early occupant, Benjamin Morton (1875–1952). Morton was the president of the wholesale grocer, H. T. Hackney Company, and served as Knoxville's mayor from 1924 until 1927.

The Benjamin Morton House was listed on the National Register of Historic Places in 2004. Its grounds include extensive gardens.
