= Downtown Knoxville =

Central business district and neighborhood in Knoxville, Tennessee, United States

- Neighborhood of Knoxville, Tennessee
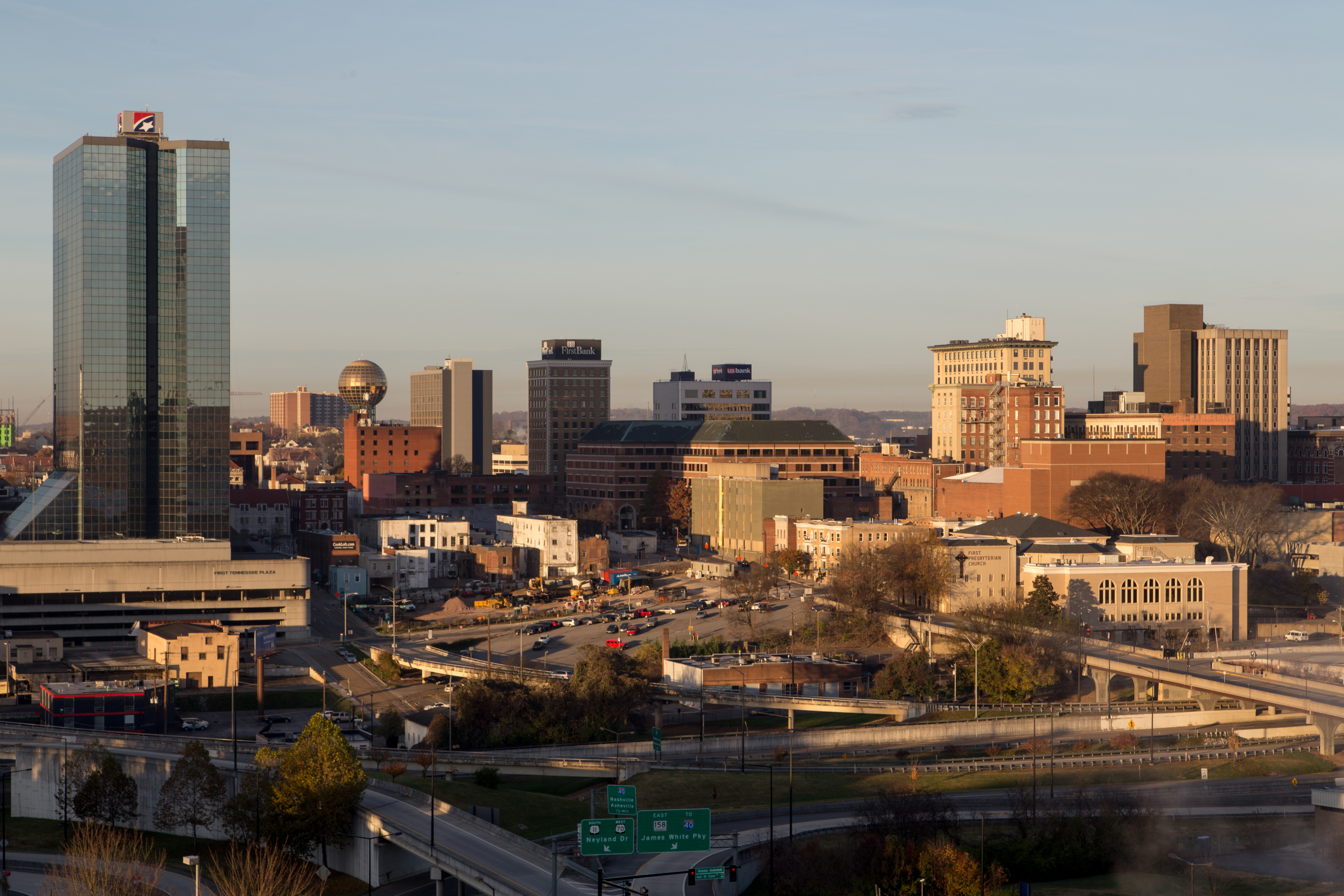

- Location within Tennessee Location within the United States
- Coordinates: 35.969322°N 83.9494097°W
- Country: United States
- State: Tennessee
- County: Knox
- City: Knoxville
- Elevation: 883 ft (269 m)
- Time zone: UTC-5 (Eastern (EST))
  - Summer (DST): UTC-4 (EDT)
- ZIP code: 37901, 37902, 37929, 37995
- Area code: 865
- FIPS code: 47093
- GNIS feature ID: 2404842
- Website: www.downtownknoxville.org

Downtown Knoxville is the downtown area of Knoxville, Tennessee, United States. It contains the city's central business district and primary city and county municipal offices. It is also home to several retail establishments, residential buildings, the city's convention center, and World's Fair Park. The downtown area contains the oldest parts of Knoxville, and is home to the city's oldest buildings.

Knoxville's downtown area is traditionally bounded by First Creek on the east, Second Creek on the west, the Tennessee River on the south, and the Southern Railroad tracks on the north. In recent decades, however, the definition of "downtown" has expanded to include the University of Tennessee campus and Fort Sanders neighborhood west of Second Creek, the Emory Place district and parts of Broadway and Central north of the Southern tracks ("Downtown North"), and parts of the Morningside area east of First Creek.

Important sections of Downtown Knoxville include Gay Street, Market Square, the Old City, the World's Fair Park, and Volunteer Landing on the riverfront.

The downtown area is home to several large office buildings, including the Plaza Tower and Riverview Tower (the city's two tallest buildings), the TVA Towers, the General Building, the Medical Arts Building, the Bank of America Building, and the City-County Building and the Andrew Johnson Building, the latter two of which house municipal offices for Knoxville and Knox County. The Knox County Courthouse and Howard Baker Jr. Federal Courthouse are located on Main Street.

Notable historical buildings include Blount Mansion, the reconstructed James White Fort, the Bijou Theatre, Tennessee Theatre, Old City Hall, and the L&N Station. Moreover, World's Fair Park is home to the Knoxville Convention Center, the Knoxville Museum of Art, and the city's most iconic structure, the Sunsphere.

Throughout much of the 20th century, city leaders struggled to revive the downtown area, which was once the primary retail center of Knoxville. Most revitalization initiatives failed, however, due in large part to a highly factionalized city government. In recent years, the city has had some success with mixed residential-commercial areas, namely in the Old City and along Gay Street, and renovation of public areas such as the Cradle of Country Music Park. This effort has been aided in large part by developers such as Kristopher Kendrick and David Dewhirst, who have renovated aging office and warehouse buildings such as the Holston, Sterchi Lofts, and the JFG Building for use as condominiums and residential flats.

== See also ==
- East Knoxville
- North Knoxville
- South Knoxville
- West Knoxville
