= Krutch =

Krutch may refer to:

- Charles Krutch, American photographer
- Joseph Wood Krutch, American author
- Thousand Foot Krutch, a Canadian rock band
