= Andrew Johnson Building =

Historic high rise in Knoxville, Tennessee

- Andrew Johnson Hotel
- U.S. National Register of Historic Places
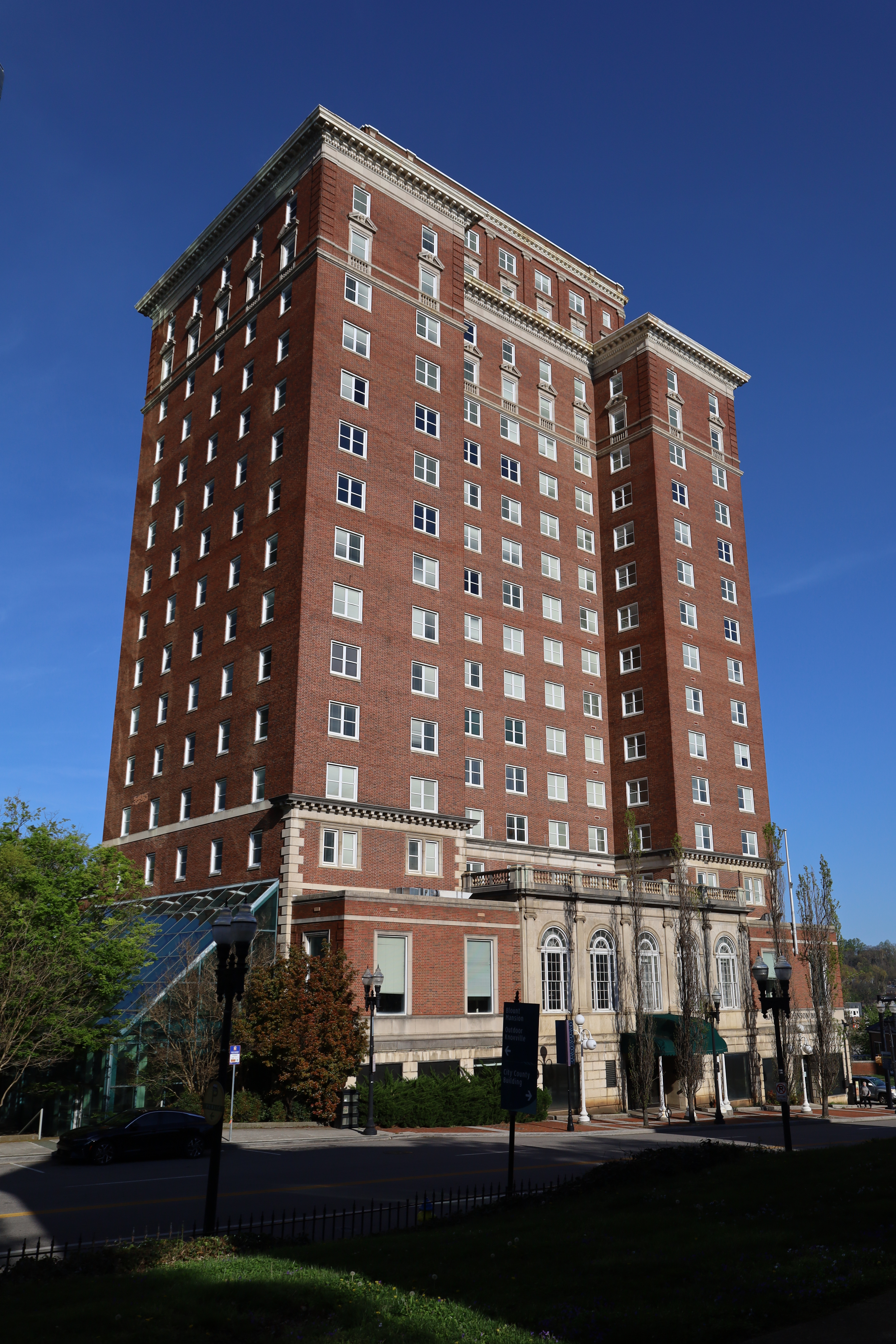
- The building in 2025
- Location: 912 South Gay Street; Knoxville, Tennessee; 37902
- Coordinates: 35°57′41″N 83°54′56″W
- Area: .35 acres (0.14 ha)
- Built: 1918–1929
- Architect: Baumann & Baumann
- Architectural style: Second Renaissance Revival
- NRHP reference No.: 80003840
- Added to NRHP: July 9, 1980

The Andrew Johnson Building is a high-rise building in the downtown core of Knoxville, Tennessee, United States. Completed in 1929 as the Andrew Johnson Hotel, at 203 feet (62 m) tall, it was Knoxville's tallest building for nearly half a century.

Named for President Andrew Johnson, the Andrew Johnson Hotel was Knoxville's premier hotel from the time of its completion through the 1960s. In its early years, the hotel was popular with foreign dignitaries visiting Knoxville to inquire about the newly created Tennessee Valley Authority, as well as with tourists en route to the newly created Great Smoky Mountains National Park. Country music singer Hank Williams spent the last night of his life at the hotel, on December 31, 1952. The studios of WNOX, which played a role in the early development of country music, were located in the Andrew Johnson in the late 1930s, and musicians such as Roy Acuff became regional stars broadcasting from the building.

In the 1980s, it was converted to office space by Knox County. In 1980, the Andrew Johnson Building was added to the National Register of Historic Places. In 2017, BNA Associates announced plans to convert it back to a hotel. The plans were approved in 2020. As of 2024, work on the hotel, set to be named Hotel Americana, has not yet begun.

== Design ==
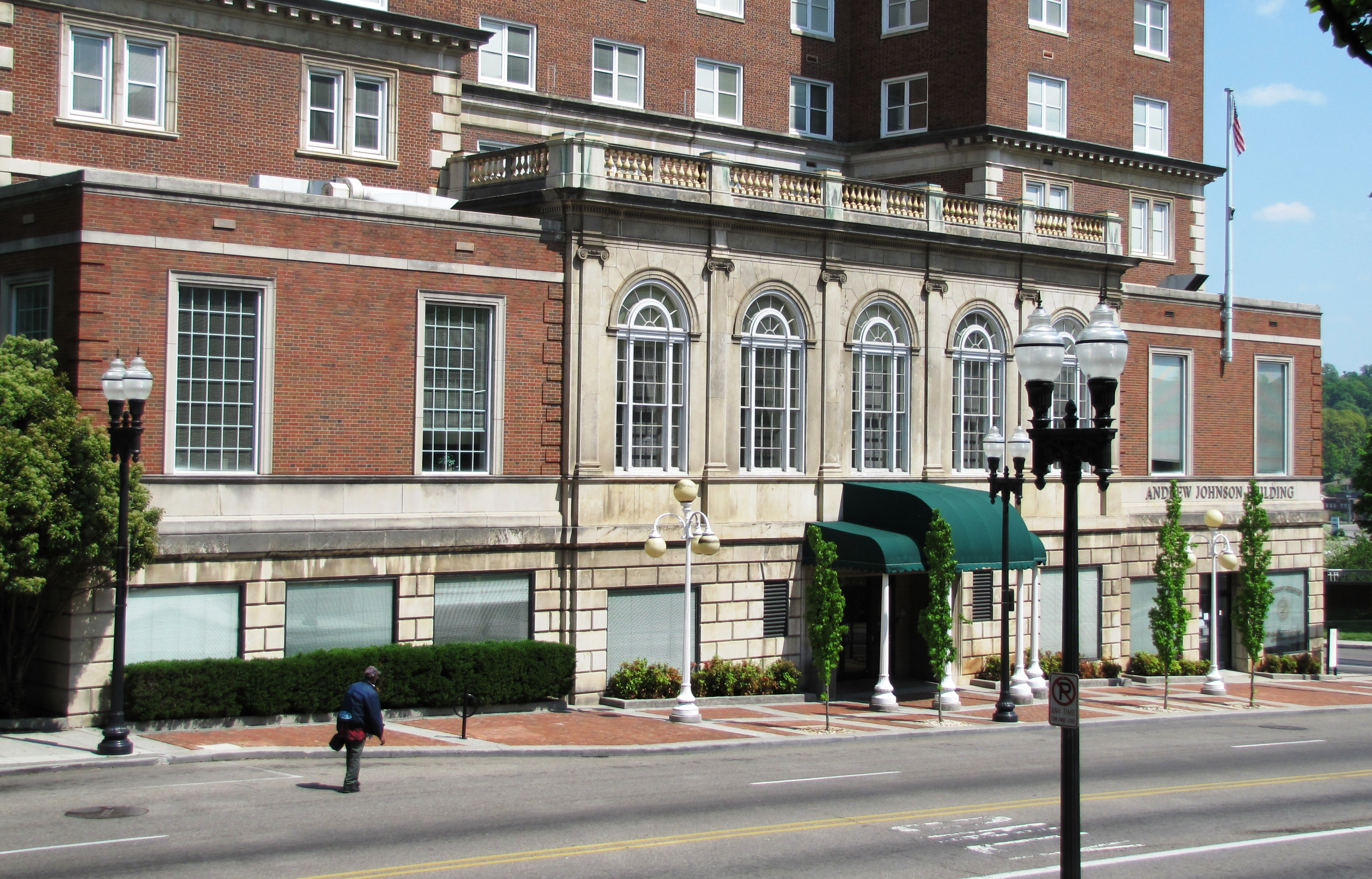
Detail of the Gay Street facade in 2010

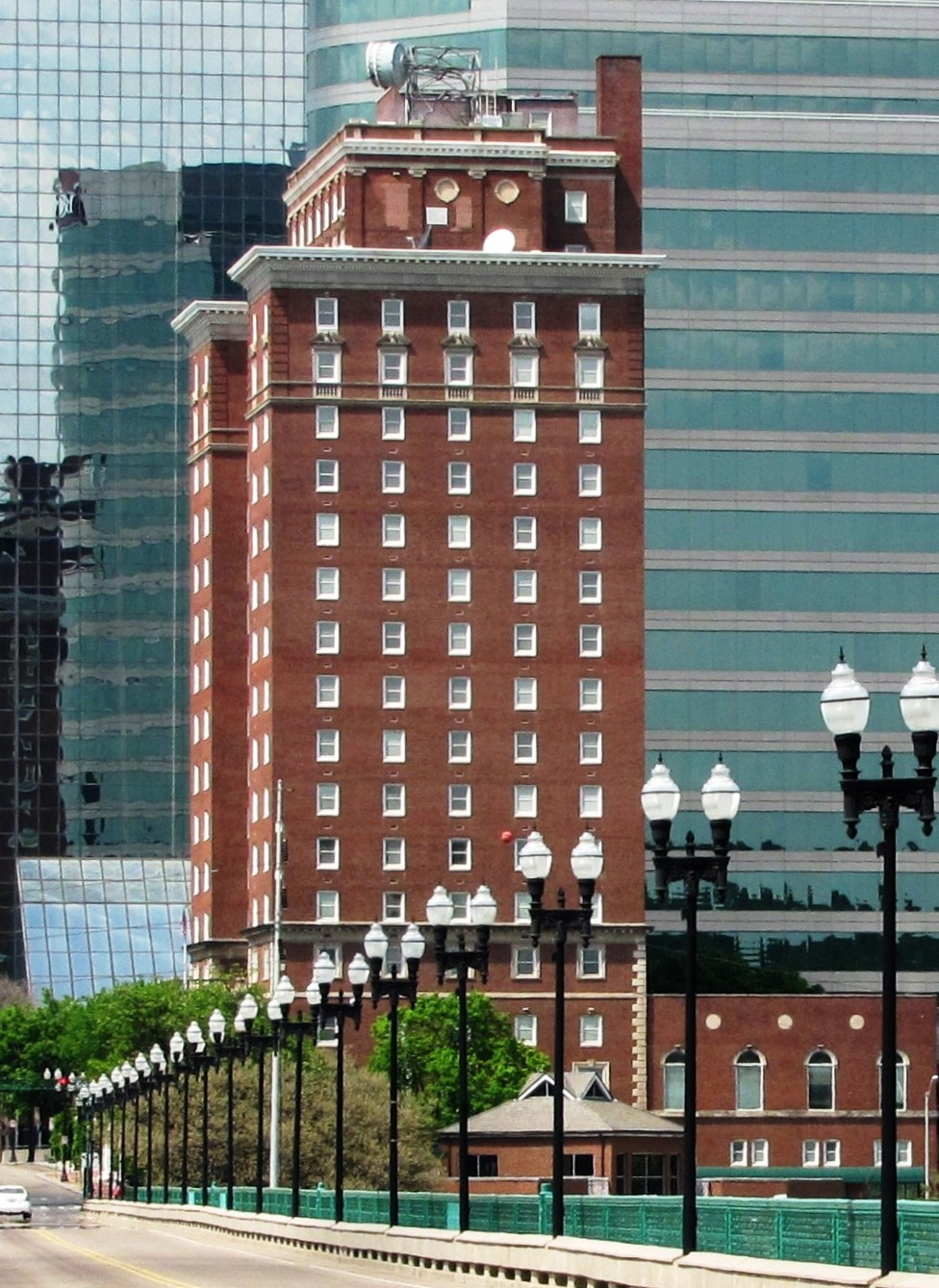
South facade viewed from the Gay Street Bridge in 2010

The Andrew Johnson Building stands at the southwest corner of Gay Street's 900-block, and shares a central courtyard with the adjacent Riverview Tower. The building's eighteen stories consist of fifteen floors, a mezzanine, and a two-story penthouse. The building is rectangular in shape, with a recess running up the middle of the west facade. The ground floor extends out beyond the rest of the building to provide a base for the unique second story, which includes an open-air pavilion. While most of the building's exterior consists of brick, the ground floor's Gay Street facade is sheathed in concrete cast to appear as rusticated stone.

The second story of the Andrew Johnson was designed as the main story, and originally contained the hotel's lobby and front desk, a ballroom, and a pavilion. The pavilion consists of a five-bay arcade, with arches flanked by Ionic pilasters. Each side of the pavilion was originally flanked by terraces and balustrades, which were replaced when the ballroom was expanded in the 1960s. The second story is higher than the building's other stories to accommodate a mezzanine, which overlooks the lobby.

Most of the windows for floors four through fifteen are simple, rectangular windows, with the exception of the fourteenth-floor windows, which are topped by small arched pediments. Atop the building is the penthouse, which is seven bays wide, and is adorned with brick Ionic pilasters. The second story of the penthouse originally had oval windows, but these have been replaced with simple rectangular windows. From the mid-1930s until the late-1970s, a large neon sign reading "Hotel Andrew Johnson" stood atop the building.

== History ==
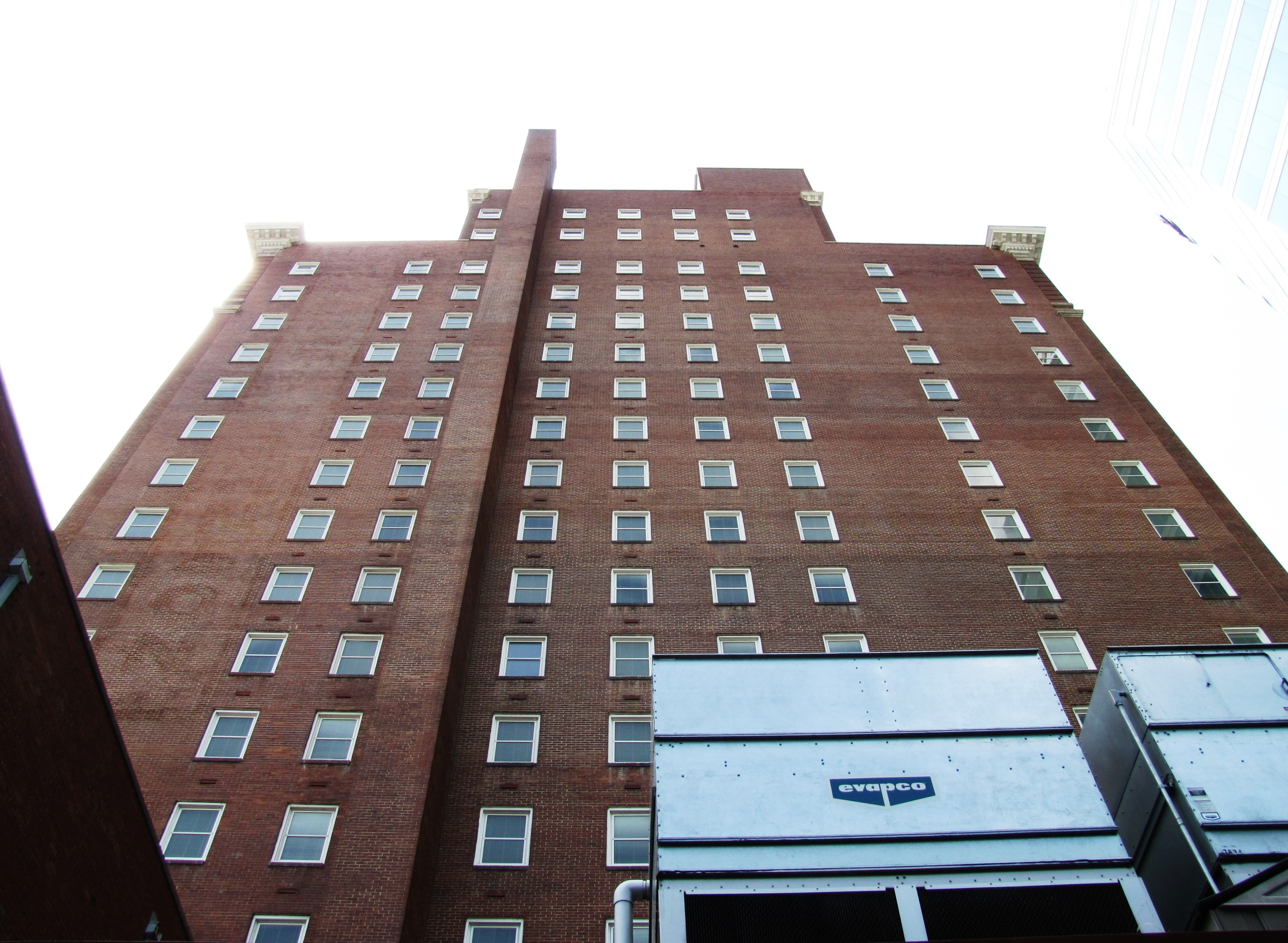
Rear of the building from the east in 2010

=== Hotel ===
The Adair Corporation of Atlanta began planning a large hotel (initially named the "Tennessee Terrace") at the corner of Gay and Hill as early as 1918, but lack of financing continuously stalled the project. The hotel was designed by Baumann & Baumann, an architectural firm responsible for a number of prominent buildings and houses in the Knoxville area, including the Knoxville Post Office on Main and the Church of the Immaculate Conception on Vine. By 1927, only seven stories of the hotel had been completed, and construction was briefly halted because of financial issues. J. Basil Ramsey, president of the Holston Union Bank, managed to raise the necessary funds, however, and the hotel was completed shortly afterward.

Business at the Andrew Johnson received a boost with the creation of the Great Smoky Mountains National Park in 1932 and the formation of the Tennessee Valley Authority (TVA) in 1933. The hotel was located a few blocks from U.S. Route 441, which connects Knoxville to the national park's main entrance. TVA's headquarters, also located a few blocks from the hotel, drew a steady stream of curious foreign diplomats and activists to Knoxville during the 1930s and 1940s, among them French existentialist Jean-Paul Sartre, who stayed at the hotel in 1945. The rise of automobile travel in the late 1920s brought large numbers of travellers to Knoxville via the Dixie Highway, with many preferring the Andrew Johnson over the rough motels along the highway's Kingston Pike stretch.

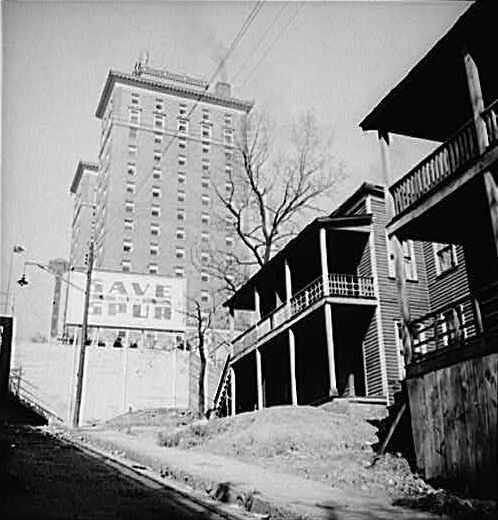
Andrew Johnson Hotel in 1941

For most of its early history, the Andrew Johnson was the choice hotel for celebrities travelling through Knoxville. During a stay at the Andrew Johnson in 1936 (the year before her disappearance), aviator Amelia Earhart remarked to a reporter that she didn't expect to live to old age. Swiss travel writer Annemarie Schwarzenbach probably stayed at the hotel while writing her story, "Auf der Schattenseite von Knoxville" ("The Shadow Side of Knoxville"). In February 1943, Russian pianist Sergei Rachmaninoff stayed at the Andrew Johnson after giving the last recital of his career at the nearby University of Tennessee's Alumni Gymnasium.

Perhaps the most well-known stay at the Andrew Johnson Hotel was that of country music singer Hank Williams, who spent the last night of his life at the hotel, and whose death is the source of numerous stories and local legends in Knoxville. Williams and his driver, Charles Carr, checked into the hotel on the evening of December 31, 1952. At some point during the night, Williams grew ill and began convulsing, and a doctor called to the hotel gave Williams injections of Vitamin B12 and morphine. At 10:45 P.M., Williams and Carr checked out and headed north for Canton, Ohio, where Williams was scheduled to perform the next day. By the time car reached Oak Hill, West Virginia, around dawn of the following morning, however, Williams had died.

Throughout much of the 1930s, radio station WNOX broadcast from the Andrew Johnson's 17th floor. The station's popular show, Mid-Day Merry-Go-Round, had featured performers such as Roy Acuff and Homer and Jethro, and listeners in downtown Knoxville frequented the hotel to see the show's broadcasts. By the late 1930s, the station was drawing some 1,000 fans to the station each day, flooding the hotel's elevators. After guests began to complain, the hotel's management asked the station to move.

In the 1940s, R. J. Reynolds, Jr. (1906–1964), the son of the tobacco magnate, purchased the Andrew Johnson. After his death, his widow maintained ownership until 1973. By this time, Knoxville's Hyatt Regency (now the Knoxville Marriott) had usurped the Andrew Johnson as the city's premier hotel, and the Andrew Johnson began to decline. The hotel changed owners several times throughout the 1970s, during which time it sometimes served to handle overflow student housing from the nearby University of Tennessee. In the 1980s, the building was renovated as an office building by the Aetna Casualty & Surety Company.

=== Offices ===
The Andrew Johnson Building had 140,000 square feet (13,000 m^{2}) of office space and housed offices for Knox County for many years. The primary occupant was Knox County Schools, the offices of which utilized fourteen of the building's eighteen floors. The building also housed the Finance, Property Development, and Telecommunications offices of the county's Public Building Authority, human resource offices for the Knox County Sheriff's Department, and the county's Probation and Pre-Trial services.

=== Conversion back to hotel ===
In 2017, BNA Associates announced plans to convert the structure back to a hotel. The plans were approved in 2020. By 2022, the county offices had been entirely vacated in preparation for the extensive renovations. As of 2024, work on the hotel, set to be named Hotel Americana, has not yet begun.

== See also ==
- General Building
- Mechanics' Bank and Trust Company Building
- Medical Arts Building
- The Burwell
