= South Market =

South Market may refer to:

- South Market, a part of Quincy Market, Boston, Massachusetts, U.S.
- South Market Historic District, Knoxville, Tennessee, U.S.

== See also ==
- Southern Common Market, a South American trade bloc known as Mercosur
- Southern Market, a building complex in Mobile, Alabama, now known as Old City Hall
- Söderköping ("South Market" in Swedish), a town in Söderköping Municipality, Östergötland County, Sweden
