= List of tallest buildings in Knoxville =

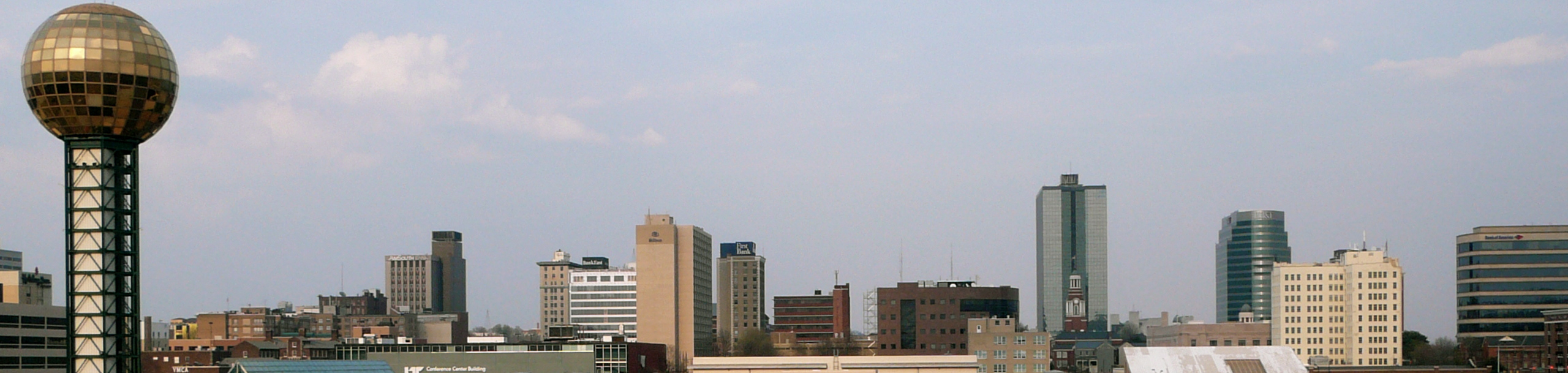
View of the skyline of downtown Knoxville, Tennessee

This list of tallest buildings in Knoxville ranks skyscrapers and other structures by height in the U.S. city of Knoxville, Tennessee. The tallest building in Knoxville is the First Tennessee Plaza (Plaza Tower), at 27 stories, followed by the adjacent Riverview Tower, at 24 stories. The Traditions Knoxville Apartment Building (formerly the Kingston Apartments) is the third highest at 21 stories. The Sunsphere, which stands at 265 feet (81 m), is the city's fourth tallest.

== Tallest buildings ==
This list ranks the top-ten tallest buildings in Knoxville, based on standard height measurement. This includes spires and architectural details but does not include antenna masts. The "Year" column indicates the year in which a building was completed.

Rank	Name	Image	Height in feet	Height in Meters	Floors	Year	Ref
1	First Tennessee Plaza		327	100	27	1981	
2	Riverview Tower		312	95	24	1985	
3	Traditions Knoxville Apartment Building (Kingston Apartments)				22	1967	
4	Sunsphere		265	81	5	1982	
5	Andrew Johnson Building		203	62	18	1928	
6	The Holston		193	59	15	1912	
7	The Burwell/Tennessee Theatre		167	51	10	1907	
8	Sterchi Lofts		147	45	12	1926	
9	US Bank Building	Upload image	146.87		12	1965	
10	Church Street United Methodist Church		141	43	2	1931	
11	Baptist Hospital of East Tennessee (A Wing)	Upload image	124	38	10	1948	

The University of Tennessee, Knoxville's campus contains several tall buildings. While sources on their height are difficult to find, sources that list the number of stories indicate that, if their heights were known, a few of them may be among Knoxville's tallest ten buildings (as in the table above). As of January 28, 2024, the tallest buildings on campus as measured by number of stories (given in parentheses for each) — and that have at least as many stories as the smallest building listed on the table above — were the McClung Tower (17), Laurel Residence Hall (15), Carrick Hall North (14), Dabney-Buehler Hall (14), Andy Holt Tower (13), Volunteer Hall (12), Hess Hall (11), 11th Street Parking Garage (10), Frank G Clement Hall (10), Massey Hall (10), Stokely Management Center (10), and the West Skybox Addition (10). Carrick Hall South is listed as having 0 stories, despite having connecting stories with Carrick Hall North.

== Demolished buildings ==
The smokestack of the University of Tennessee, Knoxville's steam plant was one of Knoxville's tallest buildings from its completion in 1966 until its demolition in 2016. Standing at 300 feet tall (which is taller than the Sunsphere), it was the tallest building on campus at the time of its completion. The coal-powered steam plant was converted to a natural gas plant, which included the smokestack being demolished; this process started in March 2014 and concluded in January 2016. A time-lapse video of the entire demolition process was recorded and posted online.

== See also ==
- List of tallest buildings in Tennessee
- List of tallest buildings in Chattanooga
- List of tallest buildings in Memphis
- List of tallest buildings in Nashville
