= Mechanics' Bank and Trust Company Building =

- U.S. National Register of Historic Places
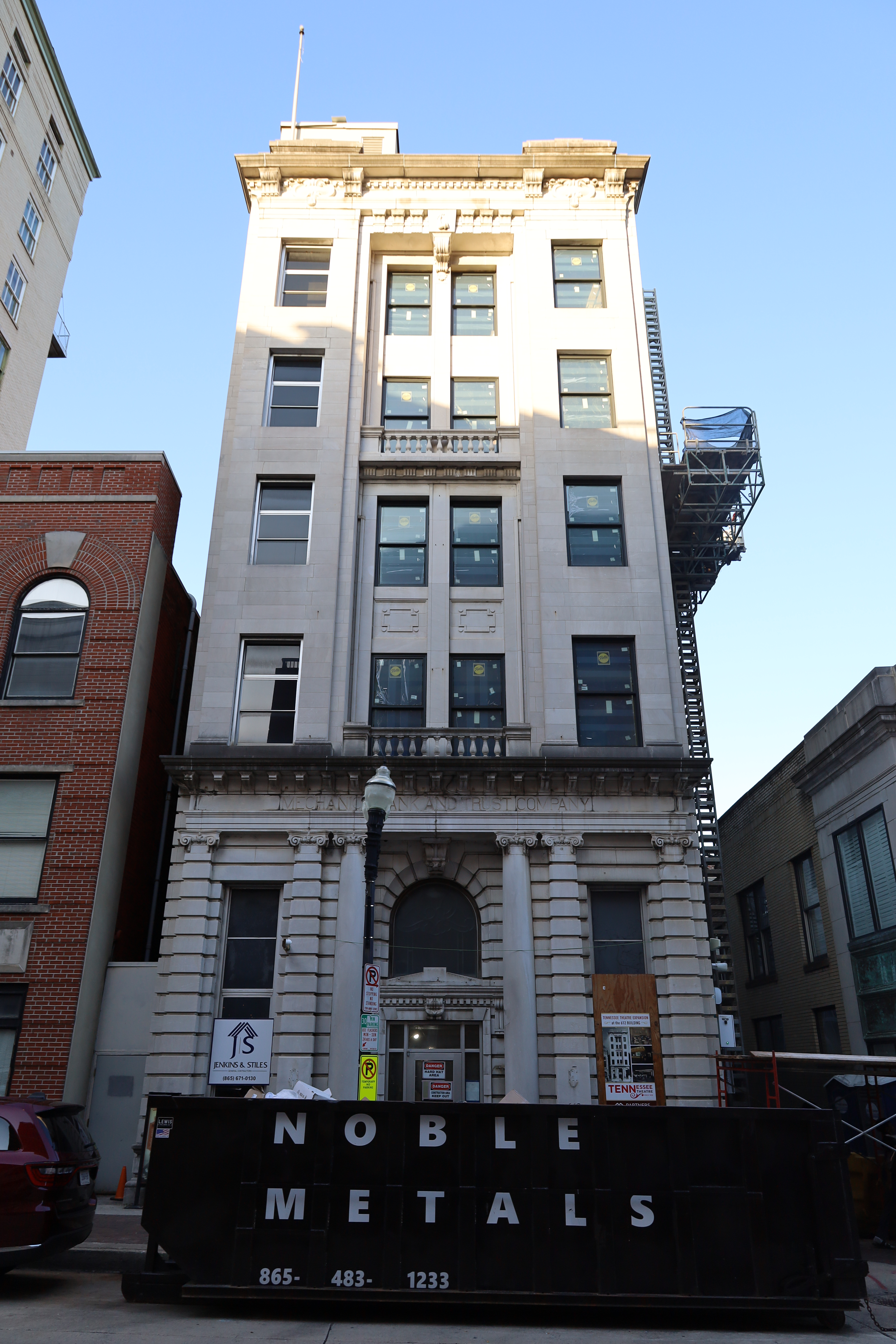
- The building in 2025
- Location: 612 S. Gay St., Knoxville, Tennessee
- Coordinates: 35°57′53″N 83°55′4″W
- Area: .5 acres (2,000 m^{2})
- Built: 1907, expanded 1923
- Architectural style: Second Renaissance Revival (influences)
- NRHP reference No.: 83003043
- Added to NRHP: January 27, 1983

The Mechanics' Bank and Trust Company Building is an office building located at 612 South Gay Street in Knoxville, Tennessee, United States. Built in 1907 for the Mechanics' Bank and Trust Company, the building now houses offices for several law firms and financial agencies. The building's facade was constructed with locally quarried marble, and is designed in the Second Renaissance Revival style. In 1983, the building was added to the National Register of Historic Places for its architectural significance.

The Mechanics' National Bank was chartered in 1882, and moved into a building at what is now 612 South Gay that same year. Within a few months of opening, the bank's president, Thomas O'Connor, was killed in a notorious shootout. In 1907, after the bank reorganized as the Mechanics' Bank and Trust, it built the first three floors of the current Mechanics' Bank building. The Union National Bank absorbed Mechanics' Bank in 1922, and added the top two stories the following year. The building later housed a branch of the Hamilton National Bank (headquartered in the nearby Holston building). In the early 1980s, the building was home to the City and County Bank, part of the Butcher banking empire, which collapsed in 1983 due to bank fraud.

== Design ==
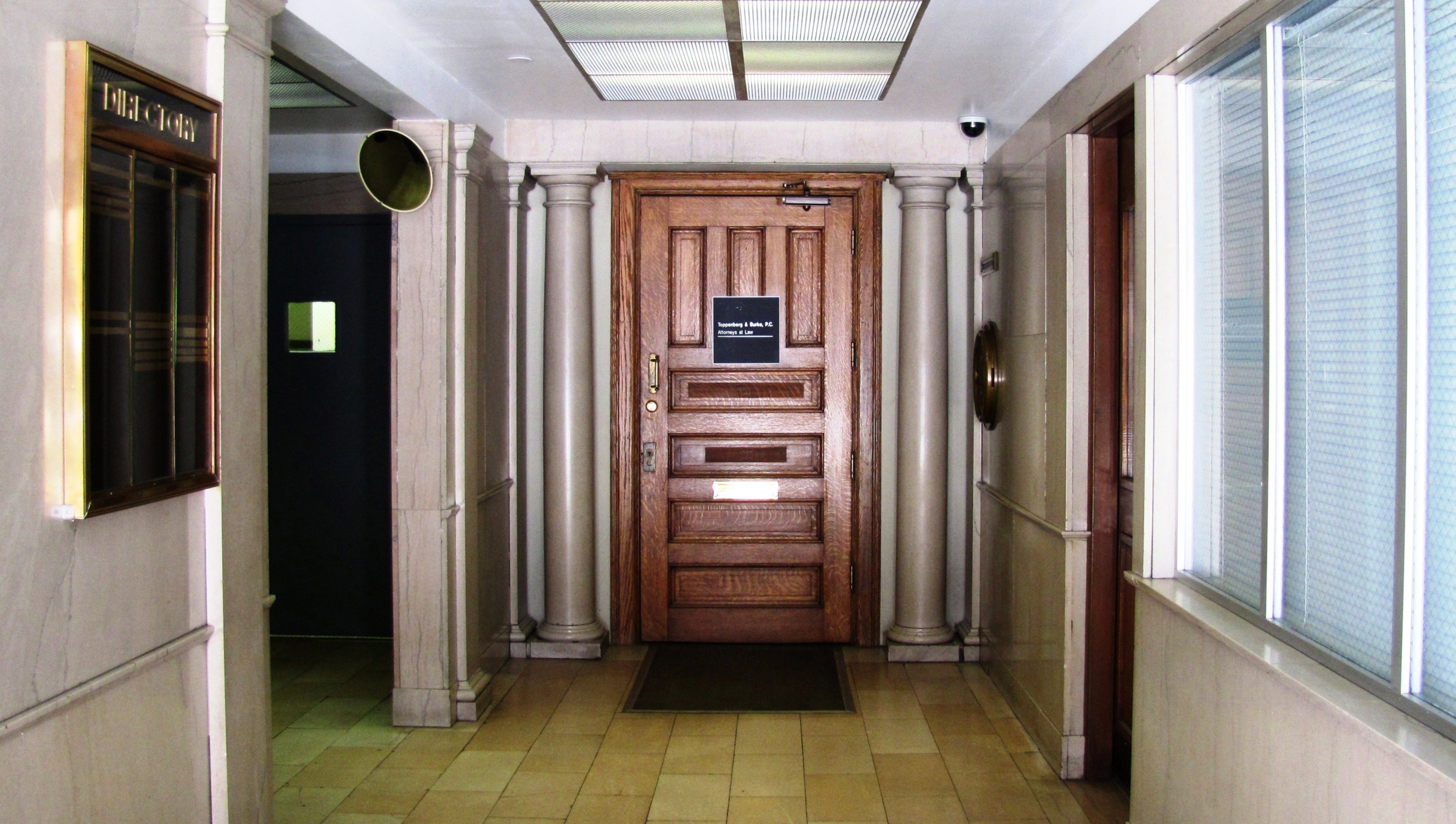
Entrance foyer

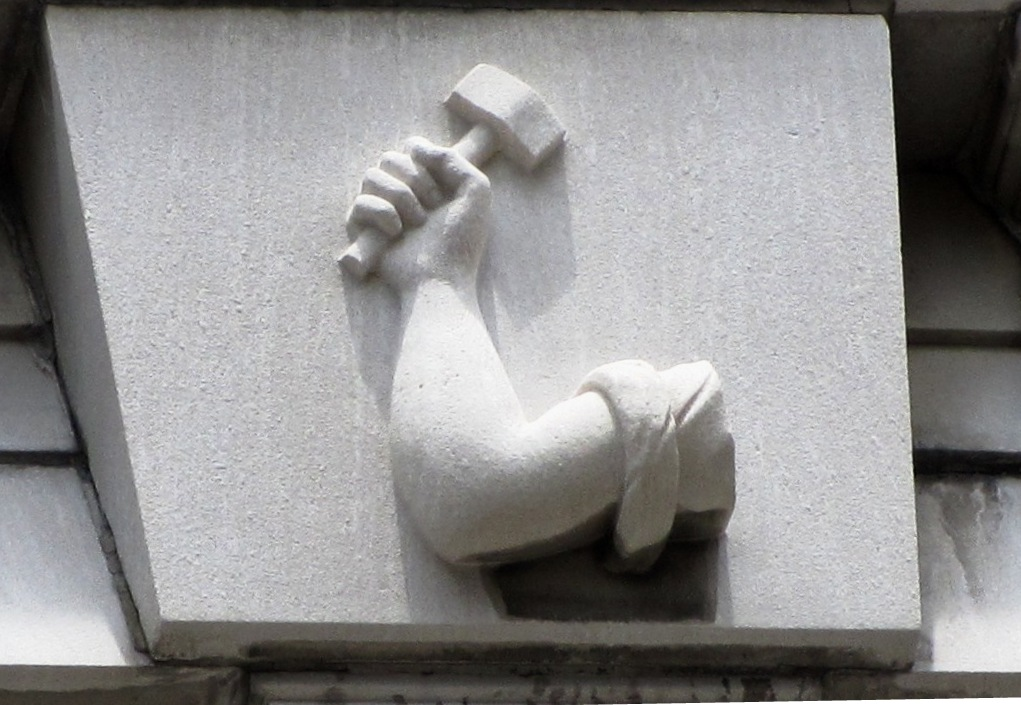
Arm-and-hammer symbol in the cornice above the building's top floor

The Mechanics Bank building is a six-story (five floors and a mezzanine) rectangular building that measures roughly 145 feet (44 m) by 32 feet (9.8 m). The building's facade (facing Gay Street) is constructed of locally quarried Tennessee marble, while the sides and rear of the building are constructed of brick and reinforced concrete. The building originally consisted of three floors and a mezzanine. In 1923, two more floors were added, with the builders carefully following the original design scheme. An elevator penthouse was added to the roof several decades later.

The design of the Mechanics' Bank building is derived from the Second Renaissance Revival style. Six Ionic capitals span the building's three-bay main floor facade, with the middle two capitals resting atop marble columns that flank either side of the recessed entrance. A heavy cornice separates the main floor facade from the facade of the upper floors. The main entrance is a high archway topped by a pedimental hood. The central bay of the upper floors' facade is recessed, with balustrades spanning the recess between the first and second floors and the third and fourth floors, and a stylized cornice with a central arm-and-hammer symbol (the Mechanics' Bank symbol) above the top floor.

The interior of the building has been extensively remodeled, although some original features remain. The building's entry foyer contains pink marble walls, and two marble columns flank the lobby's central entrance. The lobby itself still retains some original marble wainscoting and plaster beams. Nine columns border the two-story lobby of the first floor suite with crown molding and a large mezzanine above the original bank vault that has been remodeled and now serves the purpose of a kitchen.

== History ==
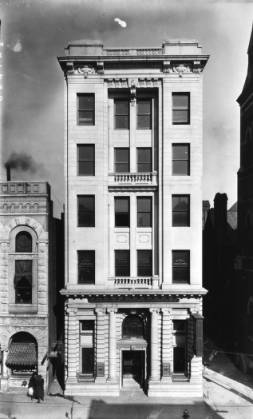
Building in the 1920s

=== Early history of the property ===
The land on which the Mechanics' Bank building is now situated (612 South Gay Street) was originally part of the property set aside by James White and Charles McClung for Blount College (now the University of Tennessee) in the early 1790s. The Bank of Tennessee (1812–1828) was the first financial institution to occupy the site. During the Civil War, this bank's building was used as an office by the Union Army provost-marshal. The building was then occupied by First National Bank (1864–1872) and its successor, the East Tennessee National Bank (1872–1882).

=== Mechanics' Bank and Trust ===
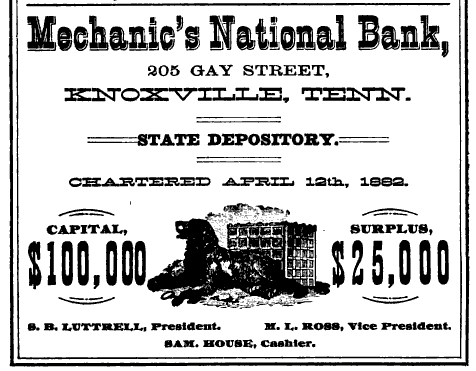
Advertisement for Mechanics' National Bank, 1884

In 1882, the East Tennessee National Bank moved to a new building, and the Mechanics' National Bank, chartered that same year, moved into the older building at 612 Gay Street. The bank's first officers were Thomas O'Connor (president), Edward J. Sanford (vice president), and Samuel House (cashier). In October 1882, O'Connor was killed in a shootout with Knoxville entrepreneur Joseph Mabry that took place in front of the bank. The shootout, in which Mabry and his son were also killed, made national headlines, and was mentioned in Mark Twain's book, Life on the Mississippi.

After O'Connor's death, Sanford served as the bank's president until 1883, when Knoxville businessman and future mayor Samuel B. Luttrell (1844–1933) was named president. Luttrell remained president of the bank for several decades. In 1900, the book, Standard History of Knoxville, reported that the bank had assets of $100,000 in capital, $110,000 in surplus, $500,000 in deposits, and $425,000 in loans and discounts.

In 1907, Mechanics' National Bank abandoned its national charter and reorganized as the state-chartered Mechanics' Bank and Trust Company, which built the current Mechanics' Bank and Trust Company Building. Mechanics' Bank was absorbed by Union National Bank in 1922, and Union National (which added the building's two top floors in 1923) was in turn absorbed by Holston-Union National Bank in 1928. After Holston-Union failed in 1930, it was replaced by the Hamilton National Bank, which operated a branch out of the Mechanics' Bank building for several decades.

=== Later history ===
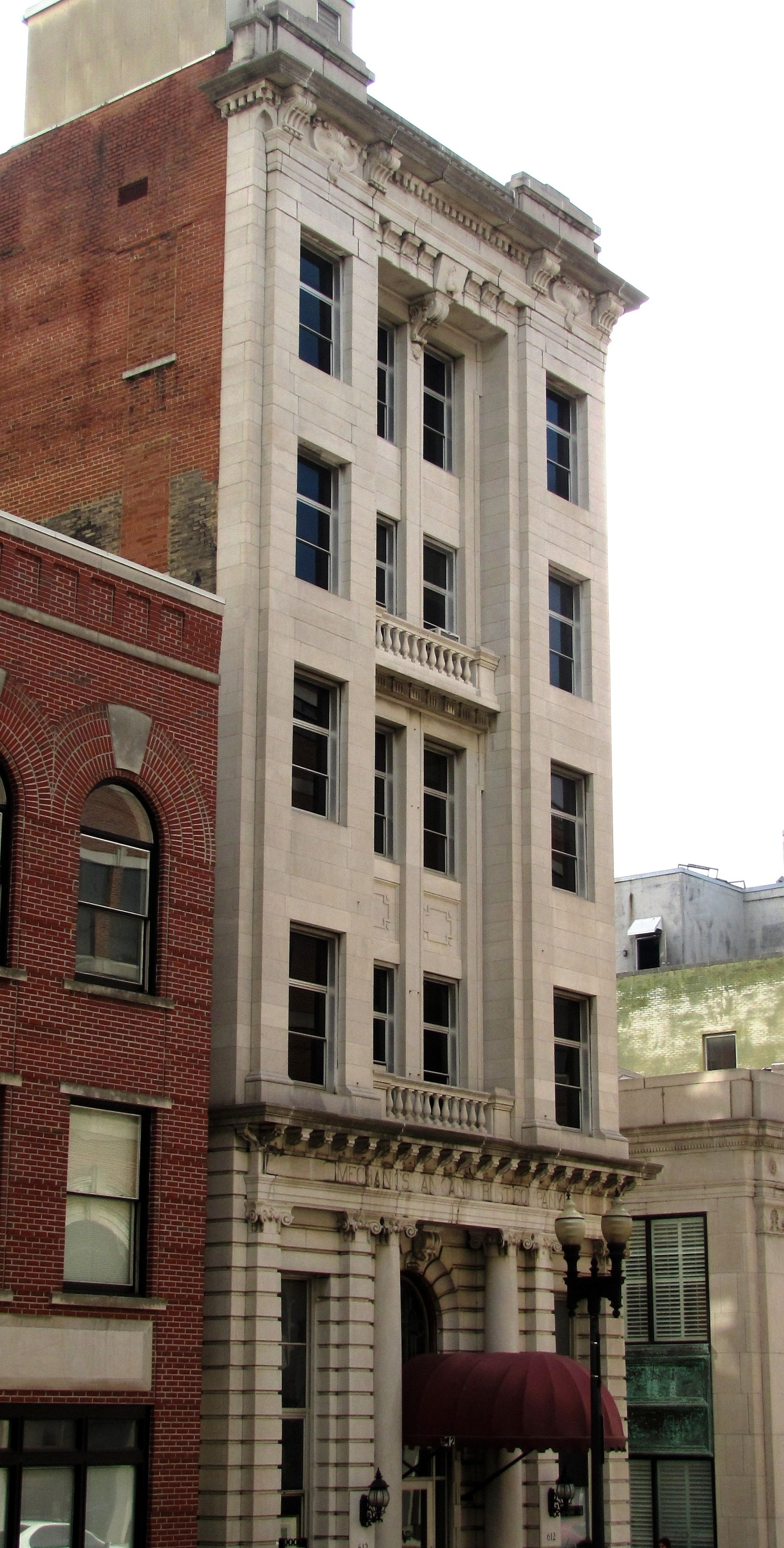
Gay Street facade in 2010

During the 1950s, the top floor of the Mechanics' Bank building hosted the studios of radio station WROL-AM, which was known for its promoter and host, Cas Walker. The Everly Brothers were among the most well-known artists to perform regularly for the station during this period.

In the 1970s, banking entrepreneur Jake Butcher acquired control of Hamilton National Bank, and renamed it United American Bank. The Mechanics' Bank building then became a branch of the City and County Bank, headed by Butcher's brother, C. H. Butcher. In 1983, after federal investigators charged the Butcher brothers with bank fraud, the City and County Bank, along with the other Butcher banks, collapsed. The building has since been renovated as an office building.

== See also ==
- Fidelity Building
- General Building
- The Holston
- The Burwell
- Andrew Johnson Building

== External list ==
- Calvin M. McClung Historical Collection – Gay Street, ca. 1920 — photograph of Gay Street's 600 block, showing the Mechanics' Bank building prior to the 1923 additions (immediately left of the church)
- Calvin M. McClung Historical Collection – Bankers' Trust Company — circa-1923 photograph
- Calvin M. McClung Historical Collection – Tennessee Theatre exterior — circa 1930s photograph showing the Mechanics' Bank building (two buildings to the right of the theater)
