= Medical Arts Building (Knoxville, Tennessee) =

- U.S. National Register of Historic Places
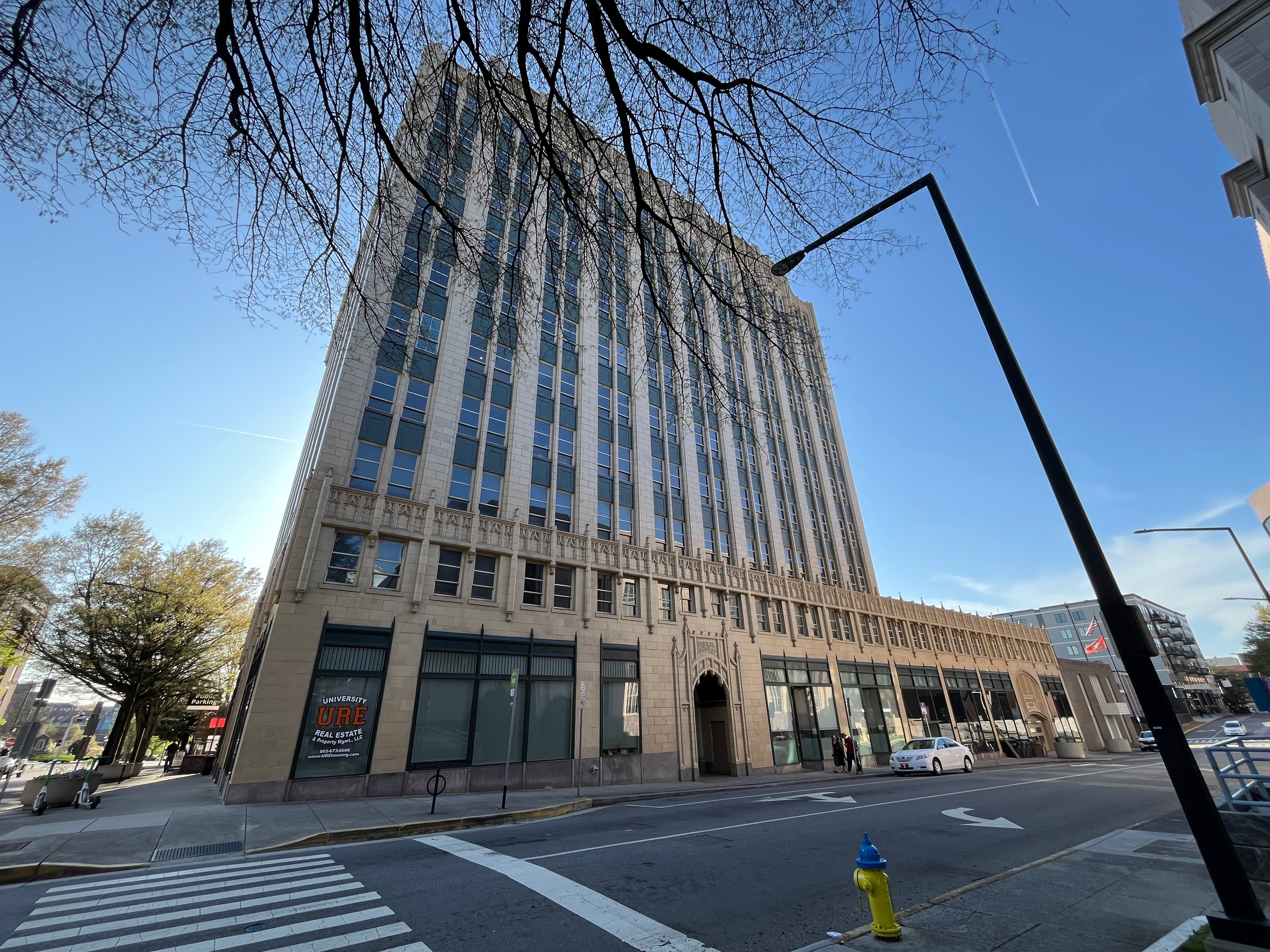
- The building in 2025
- Location: 603 Main Street; Knoxville, Tennessee
- Coordinates: 35°57′39″N 83°55′11″W
- Area: 1.5 acres (0.61 ha)
- Built: 1929–1931
- Architect: Manley and Young
- Architectural style: Gothic Revival
- NRHP reference No.: 84003573
- Added to NRHP: May 24, 1984

The Medical Arts Building is an office high-rise located at 603 Main Street in Knoxville, Tennessee, United States. Completed in 1931, the 10-story structure originally provided office space for physicians and dentists, and at the time was considered the "best equipped" medical building in the South. The building has been listed on the National Register of Historic Places as one of the region's best examples of a Gothic Revival-style office building. It has recently been renovated into mixed-use, principally residential use.

== History ==
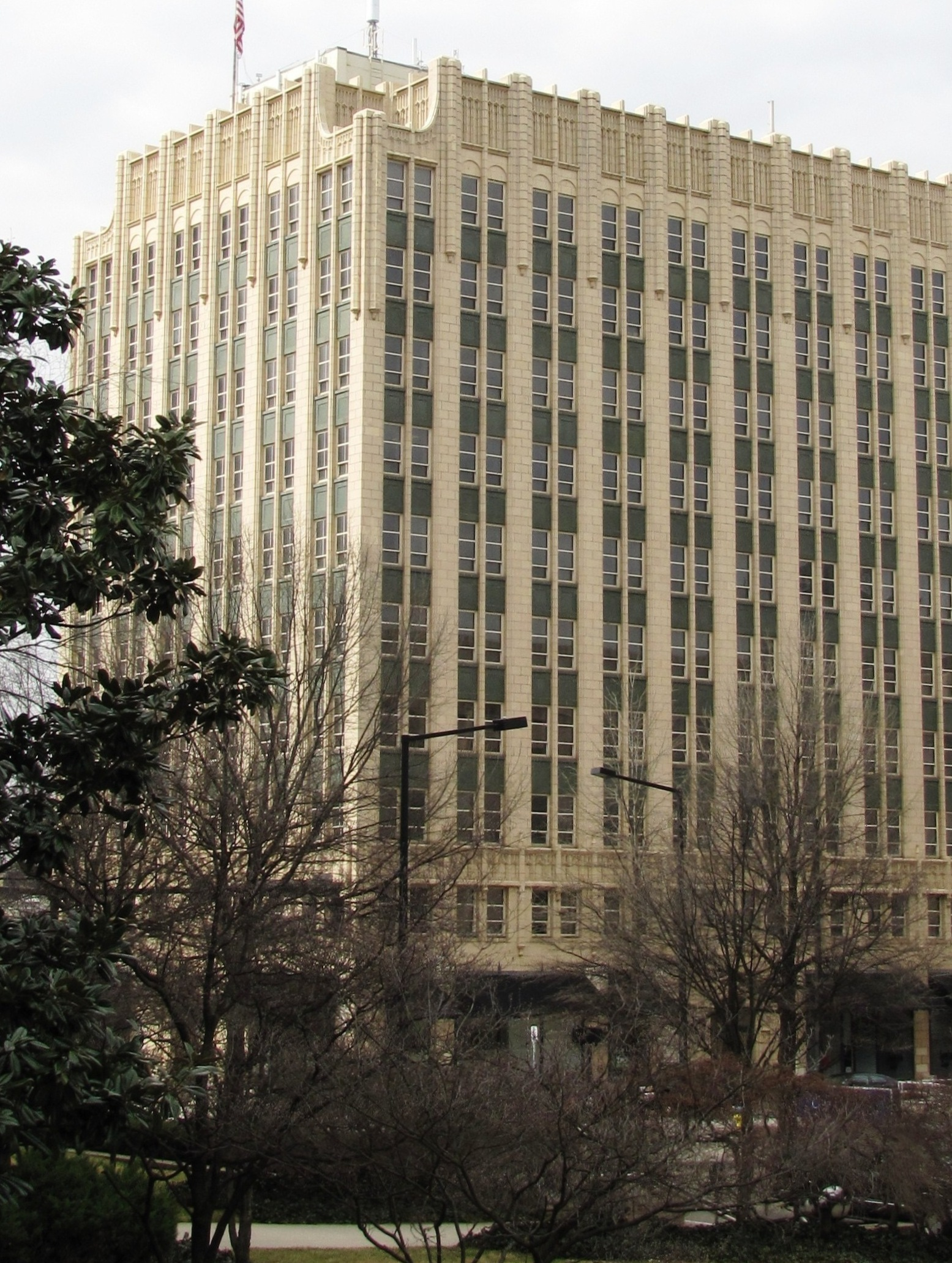
Medical Arts Building tower in 2011, viewed from the southeast

The lot on which the Medical Arts Building stands was originally located just outside Charles McClung's 1791 plat of Knoxville, though the lot had been incorporated into the city by 1795. By the late 19th century, the elaborate Victorian residence of pharmaceutical magnate A. J. Albers stood on the lot. The home of artist Charles Krutch once stood in the parking lot adjacent to the building.

By the early 1900s, numerous physicians were operating out of buildings in the area between South Market Street and Henley Street, such as those located in what is now the South Market Historic District. Following World War I, the James Park House (at the corner of Walnut and Cumberland) was converted into a clinic, in part because of the large number of doctors' offices in its vicinity. In the late 1920s, prominent physician Herbert Acuff (1886–1951), seeing a necessity for a more modern medical office building, recruited several investors, and purchased the lot at the corner of Main and Locust. Construction on the Medical Arts Building, designed by the Lexington, Kentucky-based firm Manley and Young, began in 1929 and was completed in 1931.

In the 1930s, Acuff's investment company went bankrupt, and the Medical Arts Building was sold to the Metropolitan Life Insurance Company. In subsequent years, the building's first floor tenants have included a bank, a drug store and a restaurant. In 1981, Knoxville-area developer Kristopher Kendrick purchased the building, and in turn sold it in 1983 to the Medical Arts Building Association, which renovated the building for modern office space.

== Design ==
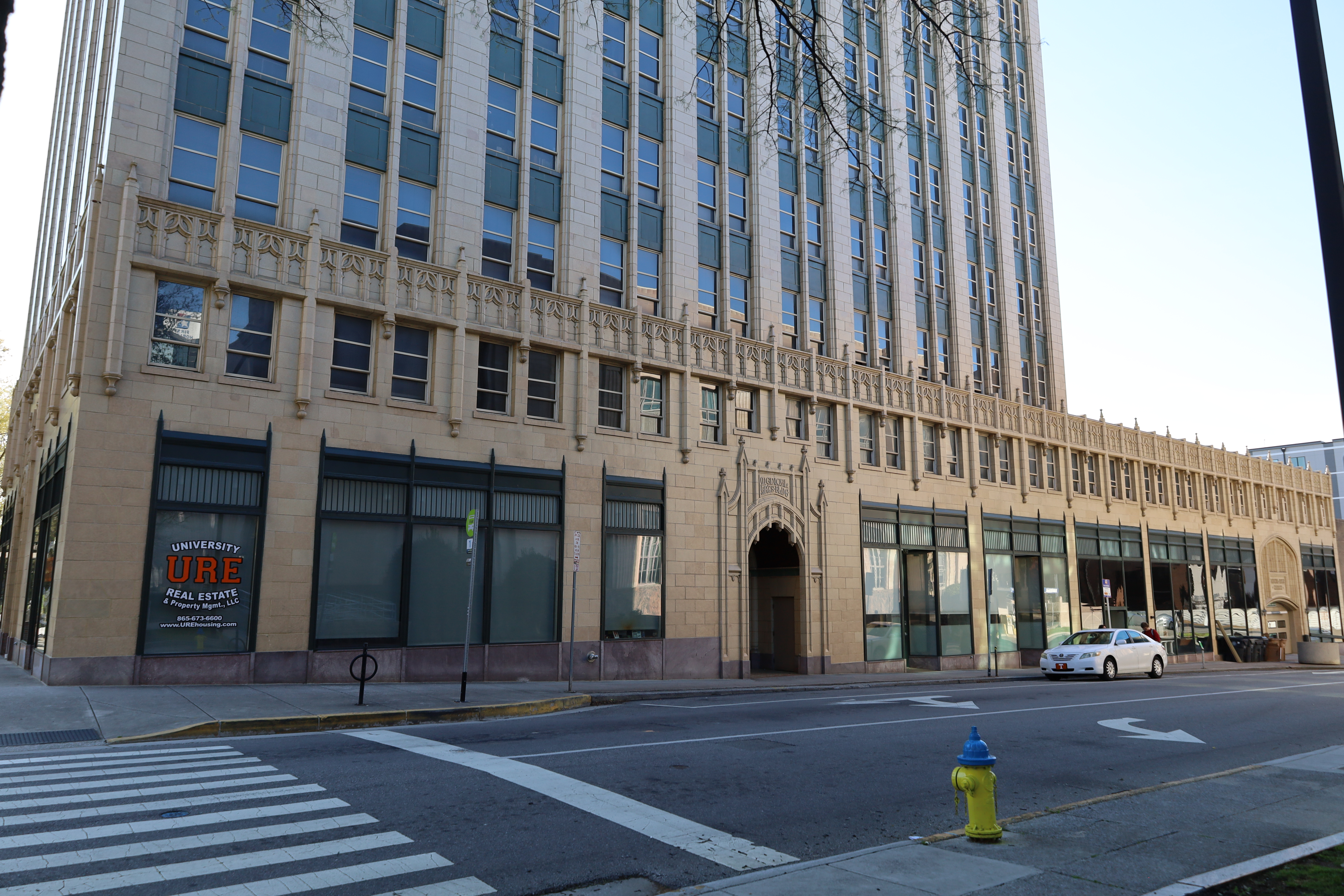
Detail of lower levels in 2025

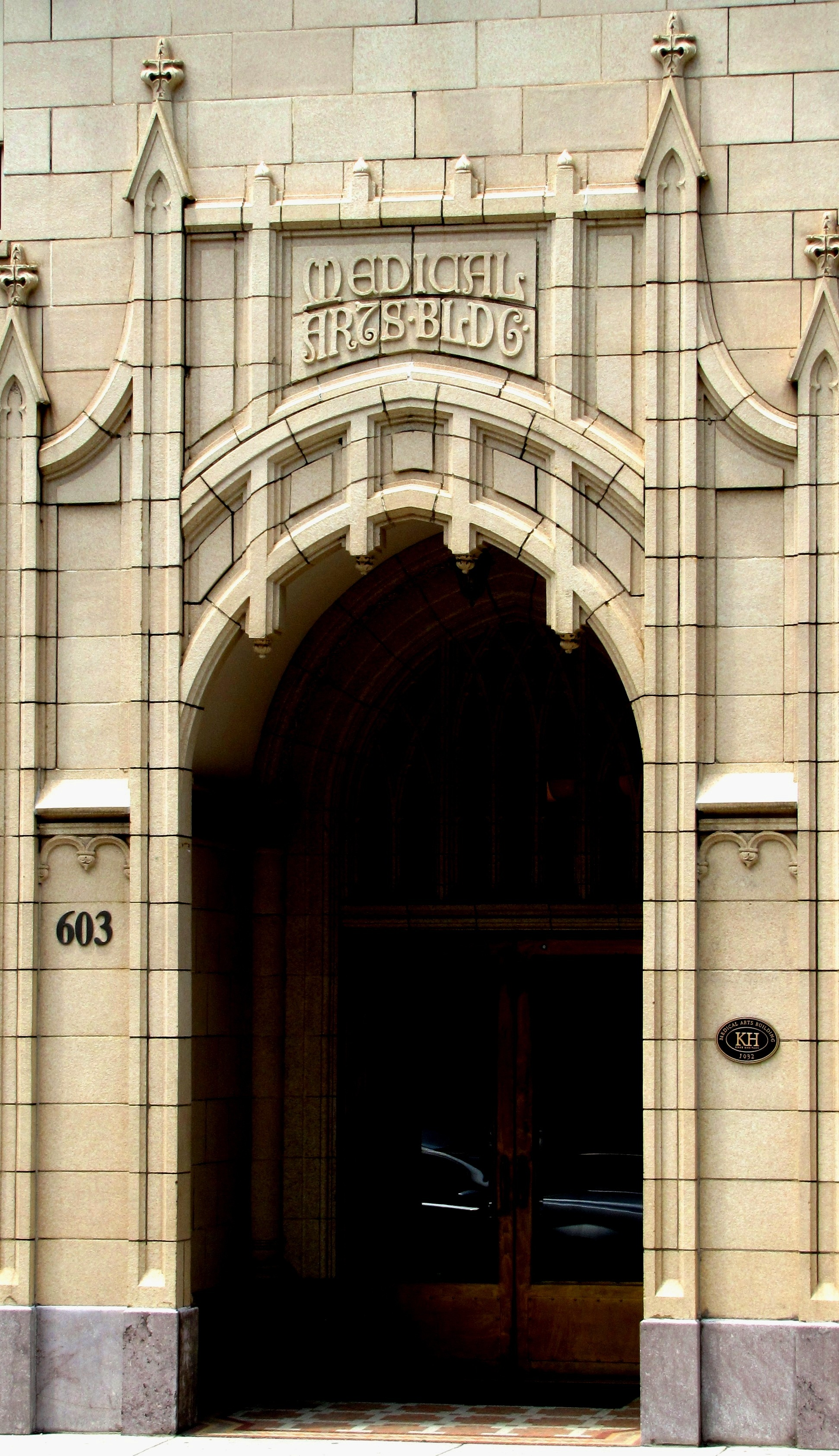
Main Street entrance in 2010

The Medical Arts Building is located at the northwest corner of Main and Locust, with an attached three-story garage extending the length of Locust all the way to Cumberland Avenue. A parking lot and the law firm Hodges, Doughty & Carson separates it from Henley Street to the west, and the Knoxville Post Office lies across Locust to the east.

The east (Locust) and south (Main) facades of the building are decorated with terra cotta elements and dark green spandrel panels. A terra cotta cornice surrounds the top of the building. The entrances along Main and Locust are decorated with terra cotta buttresses, pointed arches, and brass double-doors flanked by transoms with Gothic tracery elements. The garage is accessed via a Tudor arch entrance along Locust Street. The first floor interior contains a marble floor and walls, and upper level hallways contain marble wainscoting.

== See also ==
- General Building
- The Holston
- The Burwell
- Andrew Johnson Building
- Mechanics' Bank and Trust Company Building
- Dr. Fred Stone, Sr., Hospital
