= The Burwell =

- U.S. National Register of Historic Places
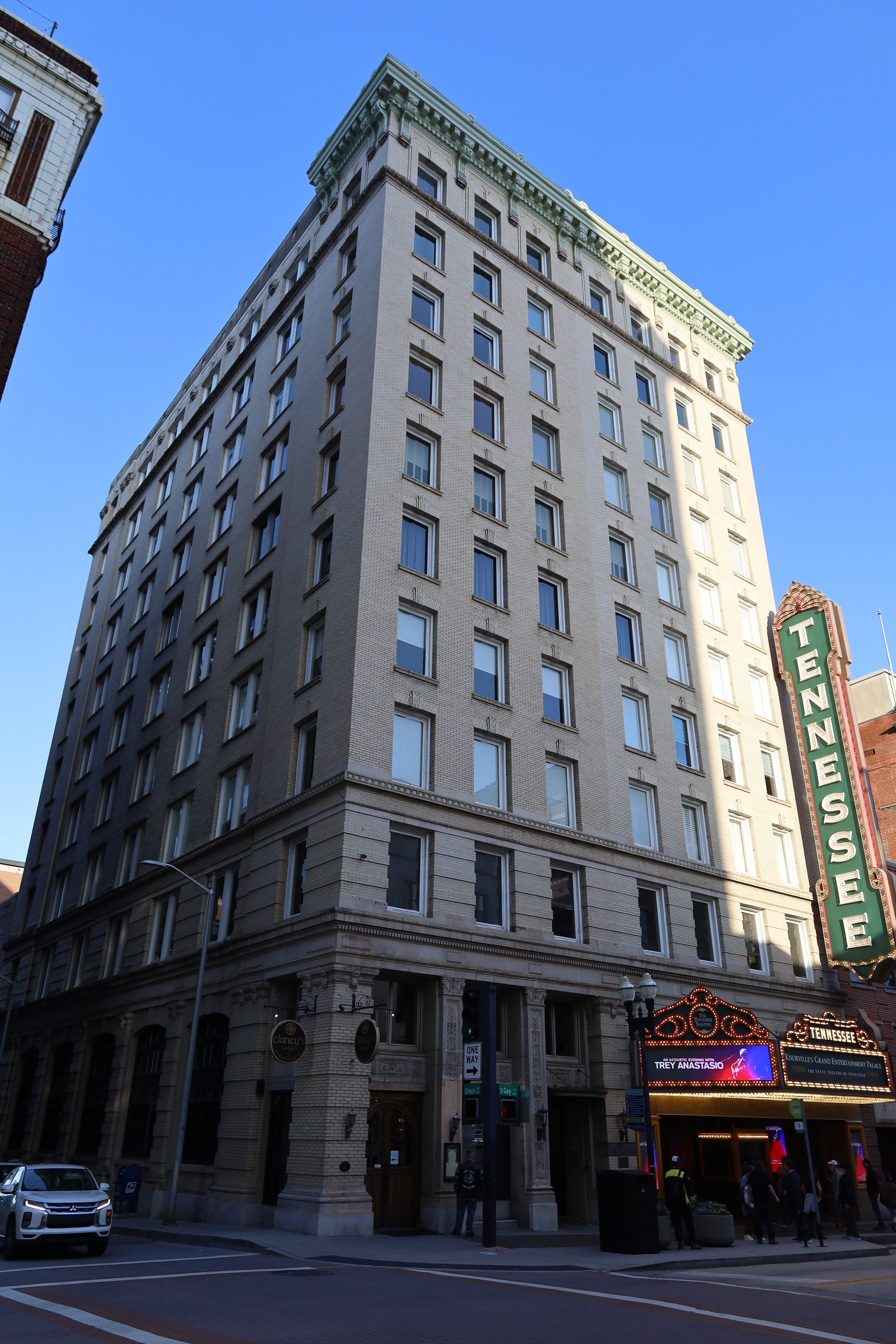
- The Burwell in 2025
- Location: 602 South Gay Street; Knoxville, Tennessee
- Coordinates: 35°57′51.25″N 83°55′3″W
- Built: 1908
- Architect: Richards, McCarty & Bulford
- Architectural style: Renaissance Revival
- NRHP reference No.: 82003979
- Added to NRHP: February 19, 1982

The Burwell is the oldest of Knoxville’s historic skyscrapers, situated on the landmark corner of Gay Street and Clinch Avenue in Knoxville, Tennessee. The building contains the historic Tennessee Theatre.

Views from the Burwell include the Sunsphere, Krutch Park, Gay Street, the Women's Basketball Hall of Fame, Kuwohi, Mount Le Conte, and the Tennessee River.

== Design ==
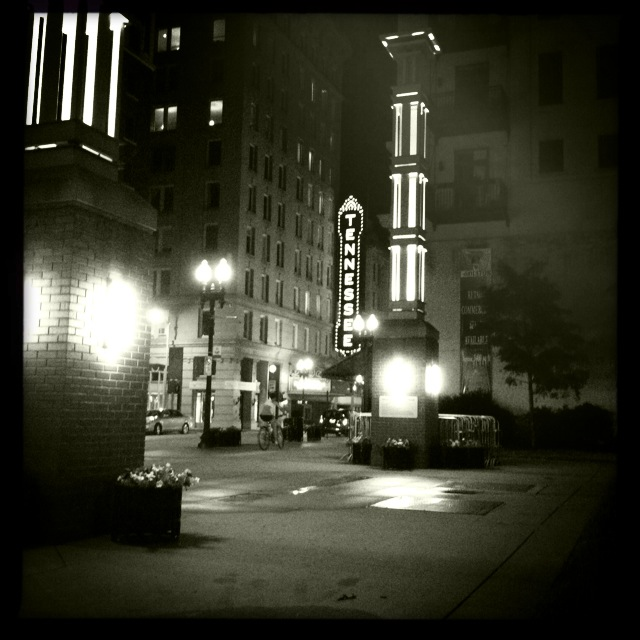
The building in 2012

The Burwell was designed by the architectural firm of Richards, McCarty & Bulford and built by George A. Fuller Construction, known for the erection of early skyscrapers. It is built in the Second Renaissance Revival architecture style. The Burwell was originally completed in 1908, and the portion of the building that sits above the Tennessee Theatre was added in 1928. The Burwell was the tallest building in Knoxville prior to the construction of the Holston in 1913.

The Burwell lobby entrance is at 602 South Gay Street adjacent to the Tennessee Theatre, and the iconic theater sign is affixed near the southwest corner of the building. The L-shaped building features yellow brick on its street-adjacent facades and red brick elsewhere.

The building exterior typifies the Second Renaissance Revival style. The ground floor, mezzanine, and second floor form a base, with pilasters from the ground to the mezzanine topped by second floor entablatures. A cornice divides the second floor from the third floor, a terra cotta belt course separates the ninth from the tenth floor, and atop the tenth floor is a parapet above a heavy cornice with interwoven large and small dentils.

Outward-facing windows are arranged in single or double bays and open by rotation around a central axis. Some rear-facing windows feature antique pebbled “chicken wire” glass. The lobby floor and elevator landings are laid using Tennessee marble, and the lobby walls are covered in Carrara marble. A vintage post office box remains in the lobby with a mail chute from the upper floors.

== History ==
=== Construction ===
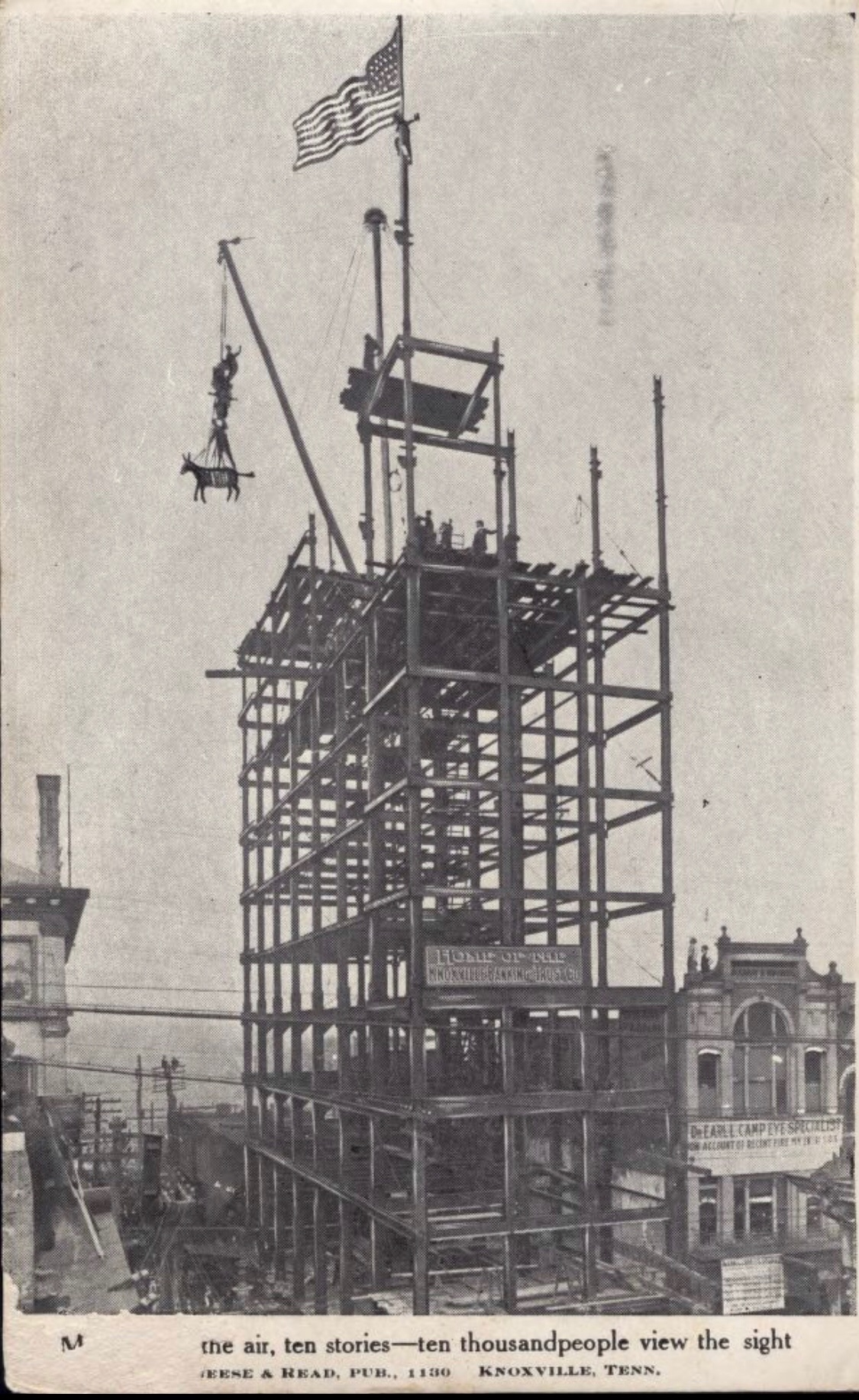
This 1907 image shows Maud the mule being hoisted to the top of the finished Burwell steel frame as part of a "topping off" ceremony.

In the 1790s, a two-story log structure on the site of the Burwell hosted classes for Blount College, considered by some to be the first co-educational university, and which later evolved into the University of Tennessee.

The building itself was originally built and owned by the Knoxville Banking and Trust Company. The steel frame structure was completed in 1907, after which Maud the mule was hoisted as part of the topping off ceremony attended by thousands of people. Maud became the construction crew mascot after frequently hanging around to watch the building construction, and she was named after the ornery female mule in the comic strip And Her Name Was Maud.

The building was completed in 1908. As a 10-story steel frame building measuring 166 feet (51 m) in height, the Burwell was Knoxville's tallest building until the completion of the Holston in 1913, and the first considered a skyscraper. The Knoxville Banking & Trust Building became a prestigious address for Knoxville professionals.

=== Early history ===
In 1912, the building was acquired by the Southern Railway Company, who established their Knoxville ticket office in the prior bank lobby. In 1917, Clay Brown Atkin, who funded many buildings' construction and was claimed to be the biggest mantel manufacturer in the world, bought the building and honorarily named it after his wife, Mary Burwell (1871-1949).

The building was scaled in 1918 by George Polley the “human fly,” who took less than 30 minutes to climb the 166 foot structure.

=== Later history ===
The Burwell was purchased in 1981 by Dick Broadcasting Company, and it was added to the National Register of Historic Places in 1982.

Over the years, the Burwell has been home to many prominent businesses, including the now defunct Knoxville Mercury and Metro Pulse newspapers. In 2007, the upper floors were converted from office space to condominiums.

The Burwell’s ground floor faces Gay Street and is currently home to Clancy’s Tavern, the Burwell lobby, and the entrance to the Tennessee Theatre. Businesses are located on the mezzanine and second floors of the Burwell, and the upper eight floors are residential.

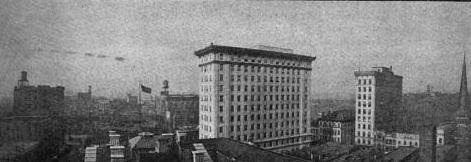
This 1919 image shows the Burwell prior to its 1928 expansion, along with the nearby Holston building, which succeeded the Burwell as the tallest building in Knoxville upon its completion in 1913.

== See also ==
- Tennessee Theatre
- Medical Arts Building
- The Holston
- Mechanics' Bank and Trust Company Building
