= South Market Historic District =

Historic district in Tennessee, United States

- U.S. National Register of Historic Places
- U.S. Historic district
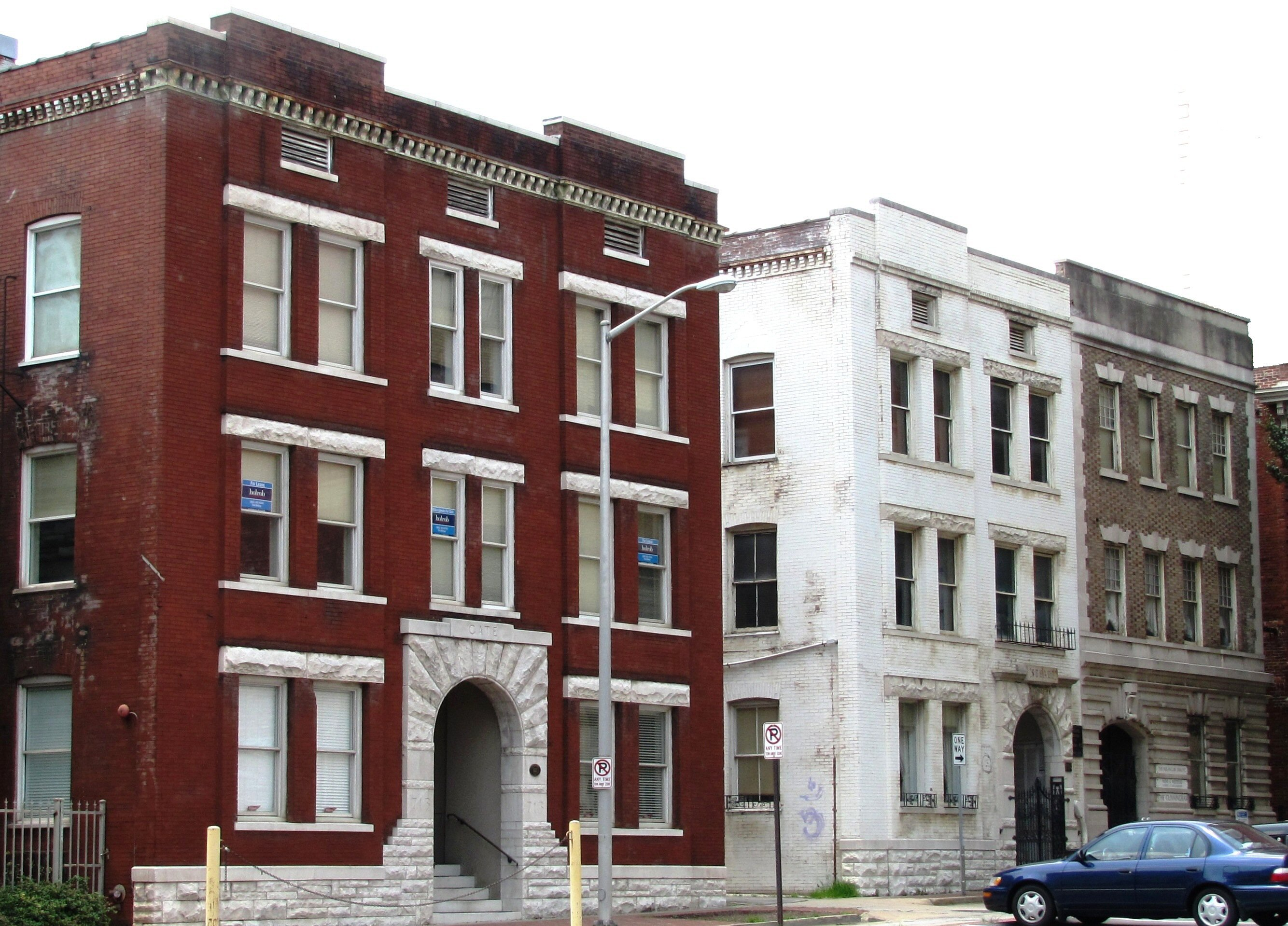
- 713, 709, and 707 Market Street

- Location within Tennessee Location within the United States
- Location: 707, 709, and 713 Market St. and 404 and 406 Church Ave. Knoxville, Tennessee
- Coordinates: 35°57′47″N 83°54′27″W
- Area: 1.5 acres (0.61 ha)
- Built: circa 1895–1907
- Architectural style: Italianate, Renaissance Revival
- NRHP reference No.: 96001403
- Added to NRHP: December 4, 1996

The South Market Historic District is a cluster of five buildings at the intersection of Market Street and Church Avenue in Knoxville, Tennessee, United States, listed on the National Register of Historic Places in 1996. The buildings, which include the Cherokee Building (404 Church), the Ely Building (406 Church), the Cunningham (707 Market), the Stuart (709 Market), and the Cate (713 Market), were built circa 1895—1907, and were used for both office space and residential space. Several prominent Knoxville physicians and three marble companies operated out of the buildings in this district in the early 1900s.

== Location ==
The five buildings comprising the South Market Historic District stand along the southwest corner of the intersection of Market and Church, with the Cherokee and Ely buildings facing Church, and the remaining three buildings facing Market. The district's buildings are dwarfed by the 15-story General Building, which rises across the street from the Cherokee and Ely. A patio and courtyard area lies between the rear wings of the Cherokee, Ely, and Cunningham buildings, and is accessible via pedestrian alleyways on the west and south side of the Cherokee. The red brick sidewalk in front of the buildings was built in 1982 as part of citywide improvements for the 1982 World's Fair.

== History ==
The block containing the South Market Historic District was part of Lot 56 on Charles McClung's original 1791 plat of Knoxville. In the city's early years, Market Street, originally known as Chestnut Street and later known as Prince Street until 1914, was one of the city's principal commercial avenues, due in large part to its access to the Prince Street Wharf at its south end along the Tennessee River. During the 1850s, Prince Street, along with Gay Street, became one of Knoxville's first paved roads.

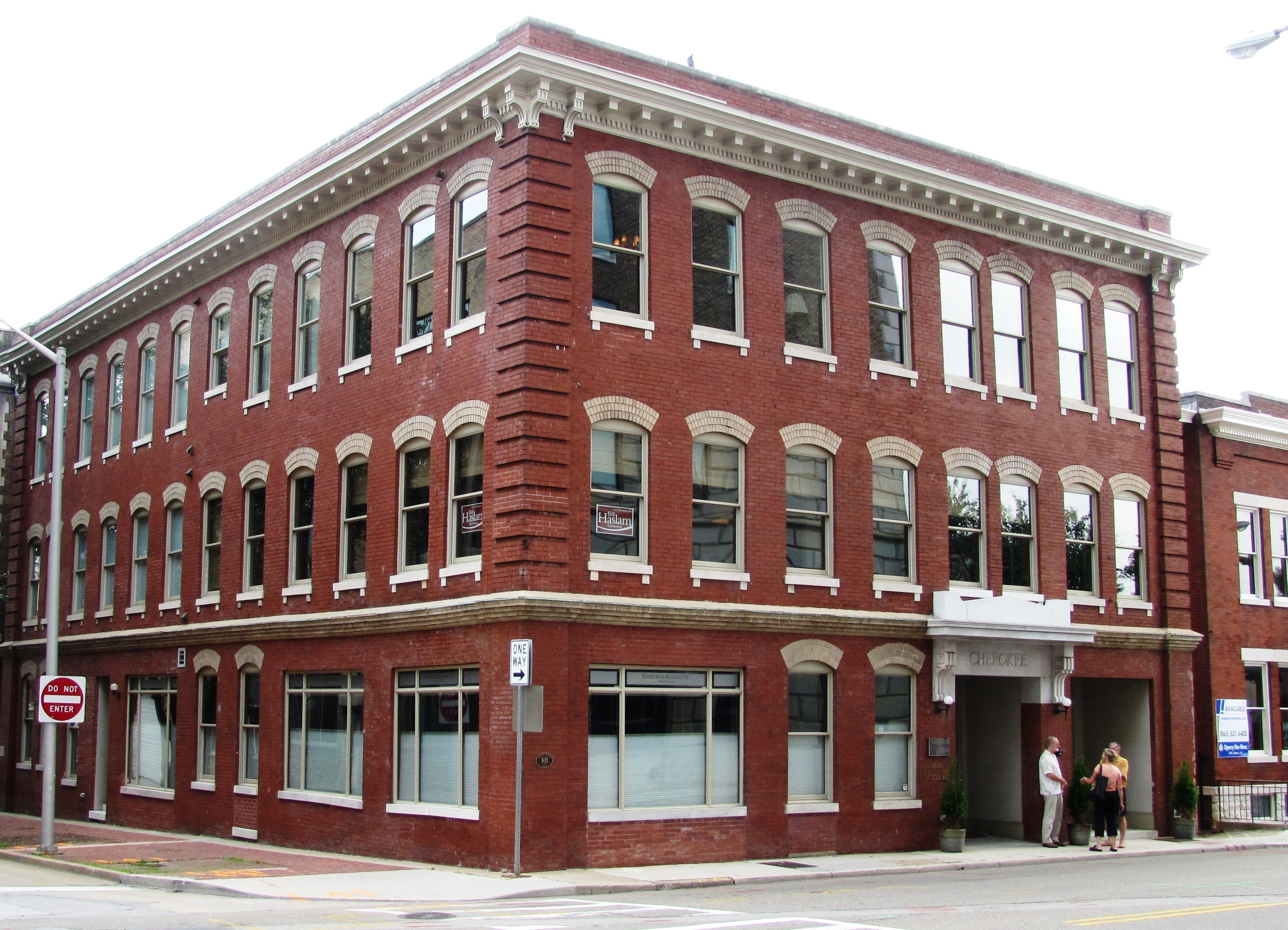
The Cherokee Building, constructed circa 1895

By the outbreak of the Civil War, most of Knoxville's commercial activity had shifted eastward to Gay Street and northward to Market Square and the railroad tracks. South Market was primarily a residential area during this period. An 1886 map of Knoxville shows a cluster of three two-story buildings along Church where the Cherokee and Ely now stand, and a plain one-story building where the Cate now stands. The most prominent building in the area was the sanctuary of the Methodist Episcopal Church, South, which stood on the lot currently occupied by the General Building (this congregation has since moved to the Church Street United Methodist Church on Henley).

During the 1890s, as Knoxville grew more congested, large single-family houses began disappearing from the downtown area. Builders preferred more compact structures that provided a mix of residential and commercial uses. Several buildings in the South Market Historic District, constructed between 1895 and 1907, reflect this transition, with first stories built for office and commercial use, and second stories for residential use.

Early occupants of the South Market Historic District included several prominent Knoxville physicians, among them J. M. Kennedy, C. E. Ristine, and S. R. Miller. Three marble companies operated out of offices in the Stuart Building in the early 1900s. Multiple coal and mining companies, as well as physicians occupied the Cunningham Building the same period. Around 1910, the Knoxville Business College and School for Shorthand moved into the first floor of the Cherokee. In 1931, at least twelve companies were operating out of the Cherokee, including four real estate firms (Doll and Carringer, the Moore Land Company, O. B. Sanderson, and Edward C. Schmid), two notaries (J. M. Moulden and John L. Mynatt), an optometrist (W. A. B. Trotter), an architectural firm (Parmelee and Sons), and a launderer, the George Loo Hand Laundry.

== Buildings ==
The following five buildings are contributing properties in the South Market Historic District:

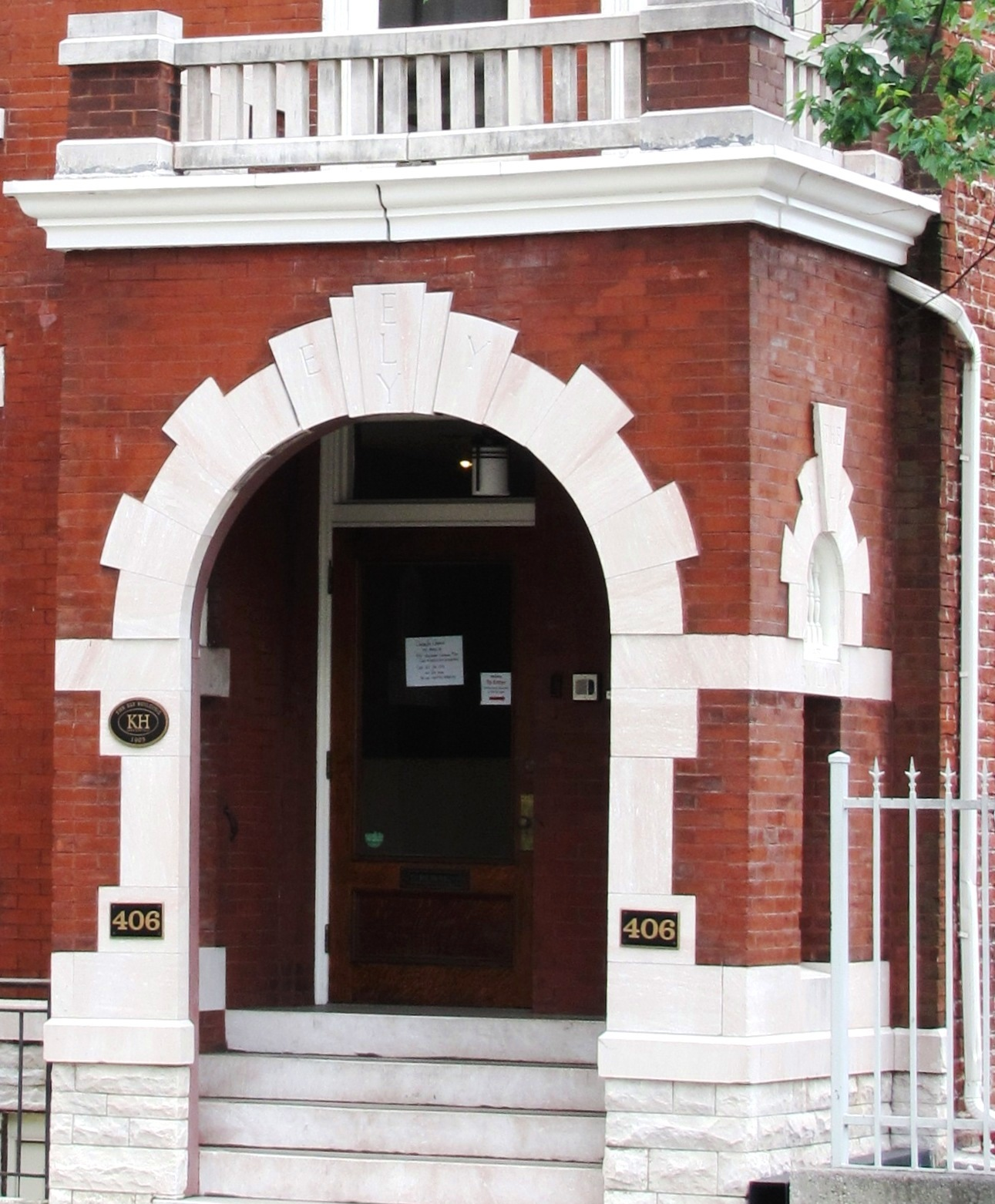
Projecting arched entrance of the Ely Building

- The Cherokee Building (404 Church Avenue), a three-story brick building with Italianate elements constructed circa 1895. This building once contained entrances on the eastern half of the Church Avenue facade as well as on the Market facade, but these have since been converted into windows. Home to numerous businesses over the years, the Cherokee has since been renovated for use as urban residential lofts and also includes the law offices of David Eldridge and Tasha Blakney (Eldridge & Blakney, P.C.).
- The Ely Building (406 Church Avenue), a two-story brick building with Italianate influences constructed in 1903 for use as a physicians' office. The building has a two-bay facade, with a projecting entrance with marble voussoir and Tennessee pink marble steps on the west bay and windows on the east bay. A stairway in front of the east bay descends to a gated basement entrance.
- The Cunningham Building (707 Market Street), originally called the "Keystone Building," a three-story Renaissance Revival-style brick building constructed in late 1907. The building is characterized by its marble trim, Tennessee "pink" marble voussoirs, and a segmented arched entrance. The Cunningham currently houses law offices for Market Street attorneys on the first floor. There are residential condominiums on its upper floors and on the basement level. In the early years of the 20th century the building housed physicians and multiple coal and mining companies as well as residences. In the 1950s the building housed the City Directory Company and Rotheberger Directory Company on the second floor. In the 1960s the National Outboarding Association operated out of the second floor.
- The Stuart Building (709 Market Street), originally called the "McNutt Building," a three-story Renaissance Revival-style brick building constructed in 1902. The building's design elements include limestone trim, marble steps, and a gated entrance. The Stuart currently houses the law offices of Market Street Attorneys Dan McGehee and Deno Cole (McGehee & Cole, P.C.), Cameron Bell and Matthew Tuck.
- The Cate Building (713 Market Street), a three-story Renaissance Revival-style brick building constructed circa 1895. Like the Stuart, the Cate was originally known as the "McNutt Building." This building has limestone trim, a recessed arched entrance, and Tennessee "pink" marble steps. The Cate currently houses the law offices of Market Street Attorneys Tyler Roper (The Roper Law Firm), Keith Stewart, Steve Sharp & Ron Attanasio (Sharp & Attanasio).

== See also ==
- Emory Place Historic District
- Medical Arts Building
