= Joseph Wood Krutch =

American author, critic, and naturalist (1893–1970)

- Born: November 25, 1893; Knoxville, Tennessee, U.S.
- Died: May 22, 1970 (aged 76); Tucson, Arizona, U.S.
- Education: University of Tennessee; Columbia University
- Occupations: Writer; critic; naturalist
- Known for: Pantheistic philosophy; ecology; conservation

Joseph Wood Krutch (/kruːtʃ/; November 25, 1893 – May 22, 1970) was an American author, critic, and naturalist who wrote nature books on the American Southwest. He is known for developing a pantheistic philosophy.

== Biography ==
Born in Knoxville, Tennessee, he was educated at the University of Tennessee and received a Ph.D. in English literature from Columbia University. After serving in the army in 1918, he traveled in Europe for a year with his friend, Mark Van Doren. Following World War I, he taught English composition at Brooklyn Polytechnic.

In 1924, Krutch became the theater critic for The Nation, a position he held until 1952.

As an author, Krutch first achieved prominence when he published The Modern Temper in 1929. There he challenged then-fashionable notions of scientific progress and optimism, arguing that science leads logically to a bleak view of the human condition. In the 1940s he wrote widely read biographies of Samuel Johnson and Henry David Thoreau and—largely inspired by Thoreau—published his first nature book, The Twelve Seasons (1949).

From 1937 to 1952, he served as a professor of English at Columbia University, where he was a popular lecturer. In 1955, Krutch won the National Book Award for The Measure of Man (1954). In that work, he partially retreated from the gloomy pessimism of his early years and argued that there are aspects of human beings, such as reason, consciousness, free will, and moral judgment, that cannot be explained by mechanistic, deterministic science.

After moving to Tucson, Arizona in 1952, partly for reasons of health, Krutch wrote several books about natural issues of ecology, the southwestern desert environment, and the natural history of the Grand Canyon, winning renown as a naturalist, nature writer, and an early conservationist. Like Aldo Leopold, who greatly influenced him, Krutch believed that human beings must move beyond purely human centered conceptions of "conservation" and learn to value nature for its own sake.

In The Great Chain of Life that he published in 1956, was a chapter entitled "The Vandal and the Sportsman". In that chapter he wrote, "When a man wantonly destroys one of the works of Man we call him Vandal. When he wantonly destroys one of the works of God we call him Sportsman."

Krutch defended the use of clichés in writing.

Krutch developed a pantheistic philosophy. Historian Donald Worster commented that Krutch "became a kind of pantheist or ethical mystic, caught up in the joy of belonging to something greater than one's self."

=== Notable family members ===
His brother, Charles Krutch, was the renowned Tennessee Valley Authority (TVA) photographer. His uncle, Charles Christopher Krutch, was a painter known for his depiction of Smoky Mountain scenes.

== Death ==
At the age of 76, Krutch died from colon cancer at his home in Tucson, Arizona on May 22, 1970. One of the last interviews with Krutch before his death was conducted by Edward Abbey and appears in Abbey's 1988 book, One Life at a Time, Please (ISBN 0805006036).

== Legacy ==
Many of Krutch's manuscripts and typescripts are held by the University of Arizona, where the Joseph Wood Krutch Cactus Garden was named in his honor in 1980. Upon his death, The New York Times lauded Krutch in an editorial, declaring that concern for the environment by many young Americans "should turn a generation unfamiliar with Joseph Wood Krutch to a reading of his books with delight to themselves and profit to the world."

== Selected works ==
- Edgar Allan Poe: A Study in Genius (1926)
- The Modern Temper (1929)
- Experience and Art: Some Aspects of the Esthetics of Literature (1932)
- The American Drama Since 1918: An Informal History (1939)
- Samuel Johnson: A Biography (1944)
- Henry David Thoreau (1948)
- The Twelve Seasons (1949)
- A Kind of Pantheism The Saturday Review (10 June 1950) 33: 7–8, 30–34
- The Desert Year (1951)
- The Best of Two Worlds (1953)
- The Measure of Man (1954)
- The Voice of the Desert (1954)
- The Great Chain of Life (1956)
- The Grand Canyon: Today and All Its Yesterdays (1957)
- The Sportsman or the Predator? A Damnable Pleasure The Saturday Review (August 17, 1957): pp. 8–10, 39–40. Concerning "killing for sport"
- Human Nature and the Human Condition (1959)
- The Forgotten Peninsula (1961)
- The World of Animals; A treasury of lore and literature by great writers and naturalists from the 5th century B.C. to the present (1961)
- More Lives Than One (1962)
- And Even If You Do; Essays on Man, Manners, and Machines (1967)
- The Best Nature Writing of Joseph Wood Krutch (anthology, University of Utah Press, 1995; ISBN 0874804809)
