= General Building =

Historic high rise in Knoxville, Tennessee

- U.S. National Register of Historic Places
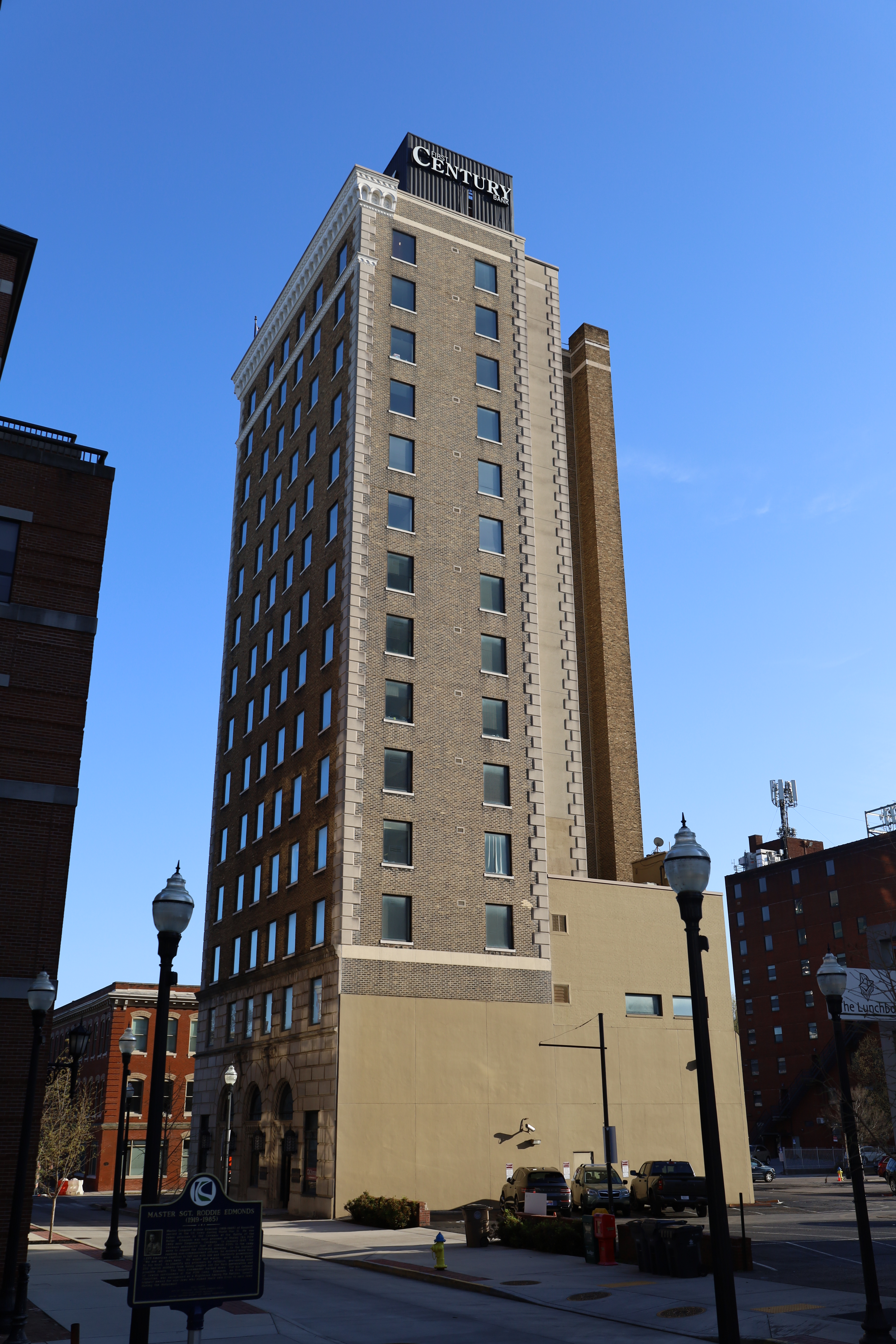
- The building in 2025
- Location: 625 Market Street; Knoxville, Tennessee
- Coordinates: 35°57′47″N 83°55′07″W
- Area: .1 acres (400 m^{2})
- Built: 1925
- Architect: Barber & McMurry; Worsham Brothers
- Architectural style: Renaissance Revival
- NRHP reference No.: 88000174
- Added to NRHP: March 8, 1988

The General Building, also called the Tennessee General Building or the First Bank Building, is an office high rise located in downtown Knoxville, Tennessee. Constructed in 1925, the 14-story building is the only high rise designed by Charles I. Barber, and has over the years housed the offices of dozens of banks, physicians, and various financial and architectural firms. The Lexington, Tennessee-based First Bank is the current anchor tenant. In 1988, the General Building was listed on the National Register of Historic Places for its architecture and its role in Knoxville's commercial history.

== Design ==
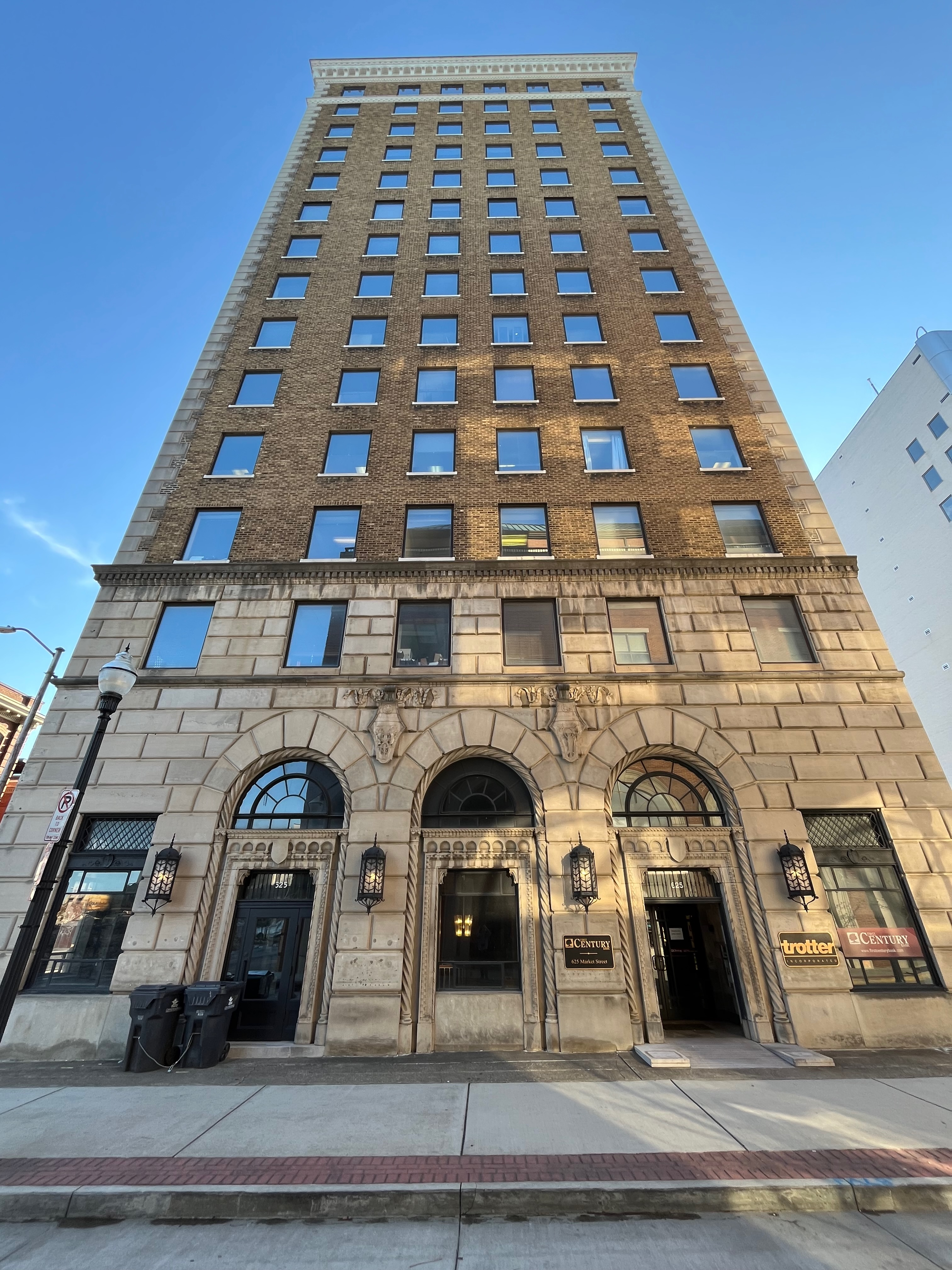
The Market Street facade in 2025

The General Building is a 14-story "L-shaped" building rising on the northwest corner of Church Avenue and Market Street. By 1958, a four-story annex had been added to the rear of the building, giving the first four stories a square shape, rather than an L-shape. The first three stories of the Church and Market facades are covered with a rusticated limestone veneer. All four corners are delineated by concrete quoins along the entire height of the building, and the roof is decorated with a terra cotta cornice. The elevator penthouse atop the building typically bears the name of the anchor tenant (currently First Bank).

The main facade, facing Market Street, consists of three arched openings, with the north opening leading to the general lobby, the south leading to the bank lobby, and the middle opening containing a window. The bank lobby is the most elaborate interior room, consisting of arched ceilings and a second-story mezzanine with a balustrade. The general lobby contains marble floors and bronze-plated elevator doors. Much of the building's interior was extensively remodeled in the early 1970s.

The General Building is situated near the heart of the Knoxville's Central Business District. Gay Street lies one block to the east, Market Square lies two blocks to the north, and the courthouse and other municipal buildings lie just over a block to the south. The cluster of buildings across the street to the south were listed on the National Register as the South Market Historic District in 1996.

== History ==
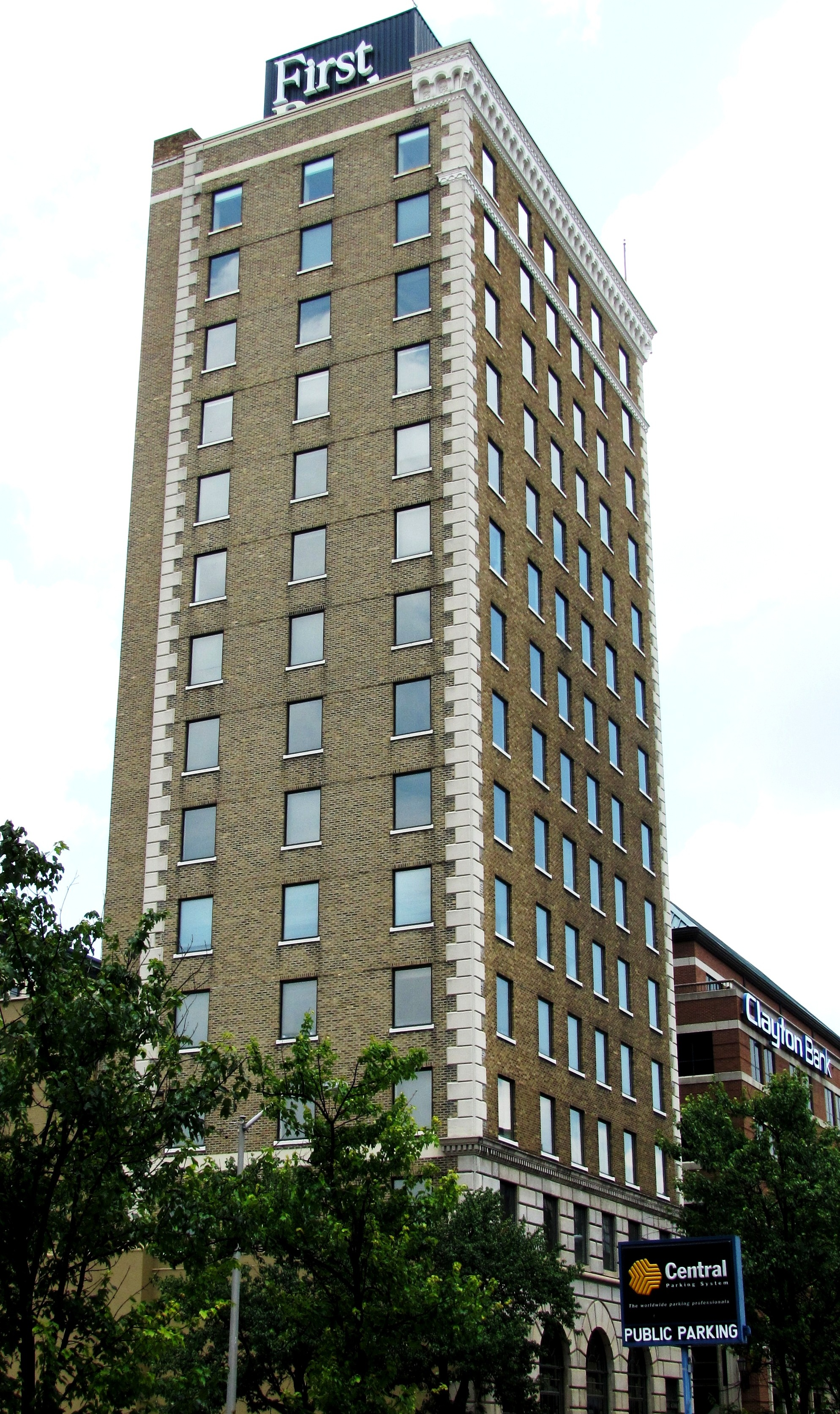
The building in 2010

The General Building stands on a lot that lies just outside Charles McClung's original 1791 plat of Knoxville, although the lot had been incorporated into the city by 1795. During the 19th century, the sanctuary of Knoxville's Methodist Church, South, congregation occupied the lot next to the building (the congregation, now the Church Street United Methodist Episcopal Church, moved to its new sanctuary on Henley Street after the old church was destroyed by a fire in 1928). By the early 1900s, the lot on which the General Building would be built was known as "Old Rambo Corner."

In late 1924, several investors formed General Building, Inc., with the intention of addressing the need for a "modern office building" in Knoxville. One investor, A. P. Brown, investigated several sites in the downtown area, but failed to find a site that could be acquired for a reasonable price. In 1925, the real estate firm Alex McMillan Company agreed to sell Old Rambo Corner at a bargain price in return for a 25-year lease on a portion of the proposed building's first floor. The building, designed by Charles I. Barber of the firm Barber & McMurry and constructed by Worsham Brothers, Inc., was completed in 1925.

Along with Alex McMillan, early occupants included Barber & McMurry, who operated out of the building until 1934, and prominent Knoxville physician Herbert Acuff, who had offices in the building until 1931. Anchor tenants through the years have included Third National Bank, the Bank of Knoxville, and BankFirst. BB&T was the General Building's anchor tenant from the late 1990s until 2003, when it moved to the larger Riverview Tower on Gay Street.

== Current tenants ==
The General Building contains roughly 50,000 square feet (4,600 m^{2}) of office space. Along with its anchor tenant, First Bank, the building houses offices for Clayton Bank and Trust, the Legacy Parks Foundation, the Cornerstone Foundation of Knoxville, the Chapman Family Foundation, and the HealthCare 21 Business Coalition. The building also houses offices for numerous financial specialists and real estate agents.

== See also ==
- The Holston
- Andrew Johnson Building
- Mechanics' Bank and Trust Company Building
- Medical Arts Building
