= Charles Krutch =

American photographer

Charles Krutch (1887 – October 27, 1981) was a photographer in Tennessee. He was nicknamed the Corot of the South (Jean-Baptiste-Camille Corot) for his soft color work. His work is in a collection at the Museum of Modern Art.

Krutch was born in Knoxville, Tennessee. His brother Joseph Krutch became an author and professor of literature at Columbia University. His uncle, Charles Christopher Crutch (1849–1934), painted the Smoky Mountains.

Krutch succeeded Lewis Hine as photographer at the Tennessee Valley Authority (TVA). The agency paid the independently wealthy Krutch, an aspiring photographer, $2,500 a year. He had taken pictures for the Knoxville News-Sentinel. He received accolades from The New York Times and was recruited by another government agency to do a series of photos for its syphilis campaign.

He retired from the TVA in 1954 after twenty years at the federal utility as a photographer and head of its graphic arts department.

Upon his death in 1981, he bequeathed land to the city of Knoxville to create a “quiety retreat for the pleasure and health of the public.” Krutch Park now hosts a sculpture garden maintained by the Dogwood Arts Foundation, which changes the sculptures twice per year. The park is also a meeting point for social activism.
