= The Holston =

Historic high rise in Knoxville, Tennessee

- Holston National Bank
- U.S. National Register of Historic Places
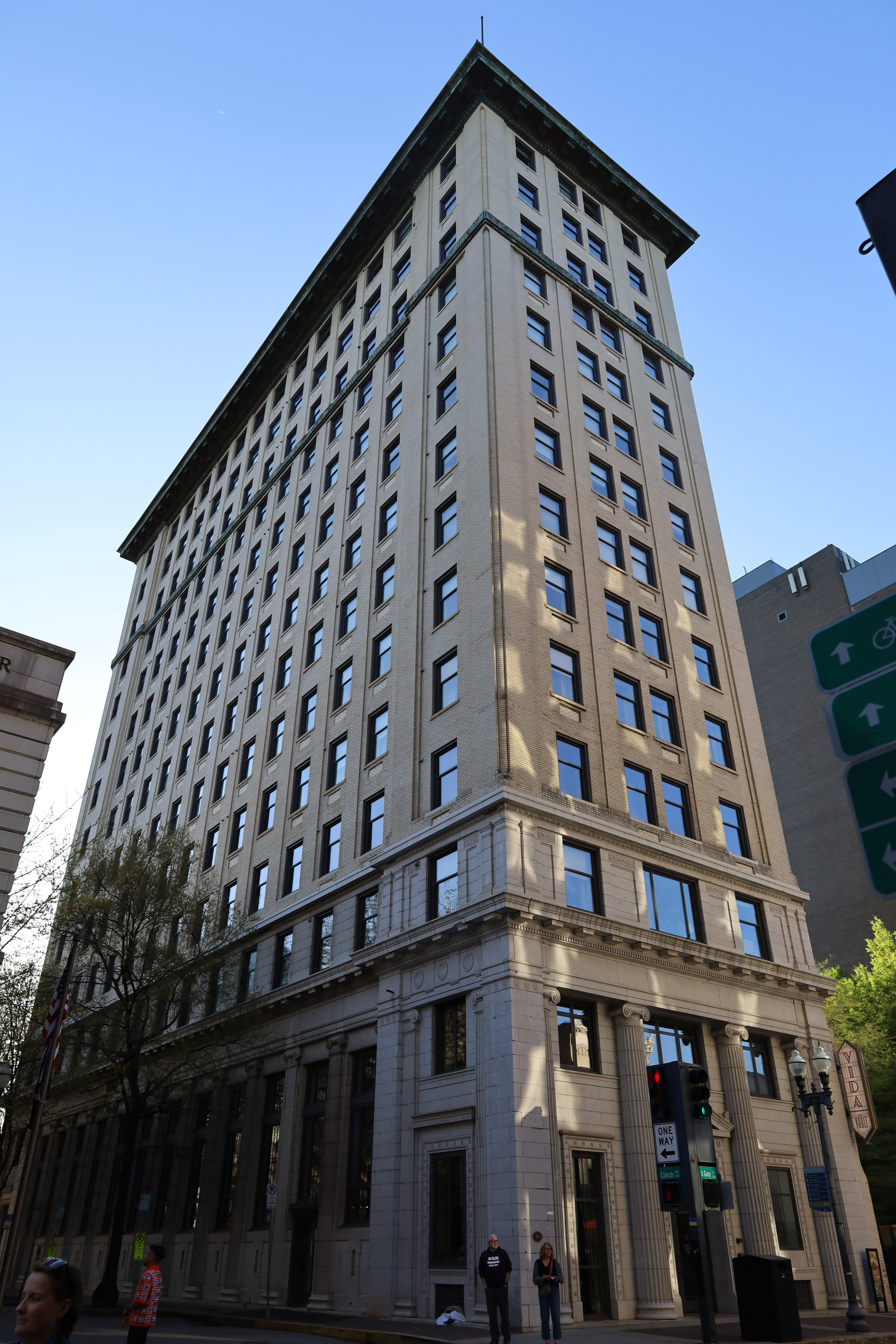
- The building in 2025
- Location: 531 S. Gay St. Knoxville, Tennessee
- Coordinates: 35°57′51″N 83°55′6″W
- Area: .17 acres (690 m^{2})
- Built: 1913
- Architect: John Kevan Peebles
- Architectural style: Neoclassical Revival
- NRHP reference No.: 79002446
- Added to NRHP: October 2, 1979

The Holston is a condominium high-rise located at 531 South Gay Street in Knoxville, Tennessee. Completed in 1913 as the headquarters for the Holston National Bank, the 14-story building was the tallest in Knoxville until the construction in the late 1920s of the Andrew Johnson Hotel, located a few blocks away. The Holston was designed by architect John Kevan Peebles and today represents the city's only Neoclassical Revival-style high rise. In 1979, the building was added to the National Register of Historic Places for its architecture and its prominent position in the Knoxville skyline.

Founded in 1890, Holston National Bank had grown to become one of Knoxville's three largest banks by 1913, when it built the first twelve stories of the Holston building. The 13th and 14th stories were added in 1928 after Holston National merged with Union National to create Knoxville's largest bank, Holston-Union. The bank failed in 1930 during the onset of the Great Depression, however, and was replaced the following year by the Hamilton National Bank of Knoxville. Over the next four decades, Hamilton National remained Knoxville's largest bank, at times controlling over half of the city's banking resources. Hamilton National was seized by Jake Butcher's United American Bank in 1975 following a bid war, and the bank moved its headquarters to the nearby Plaza Tower in 1978.

== Design ==
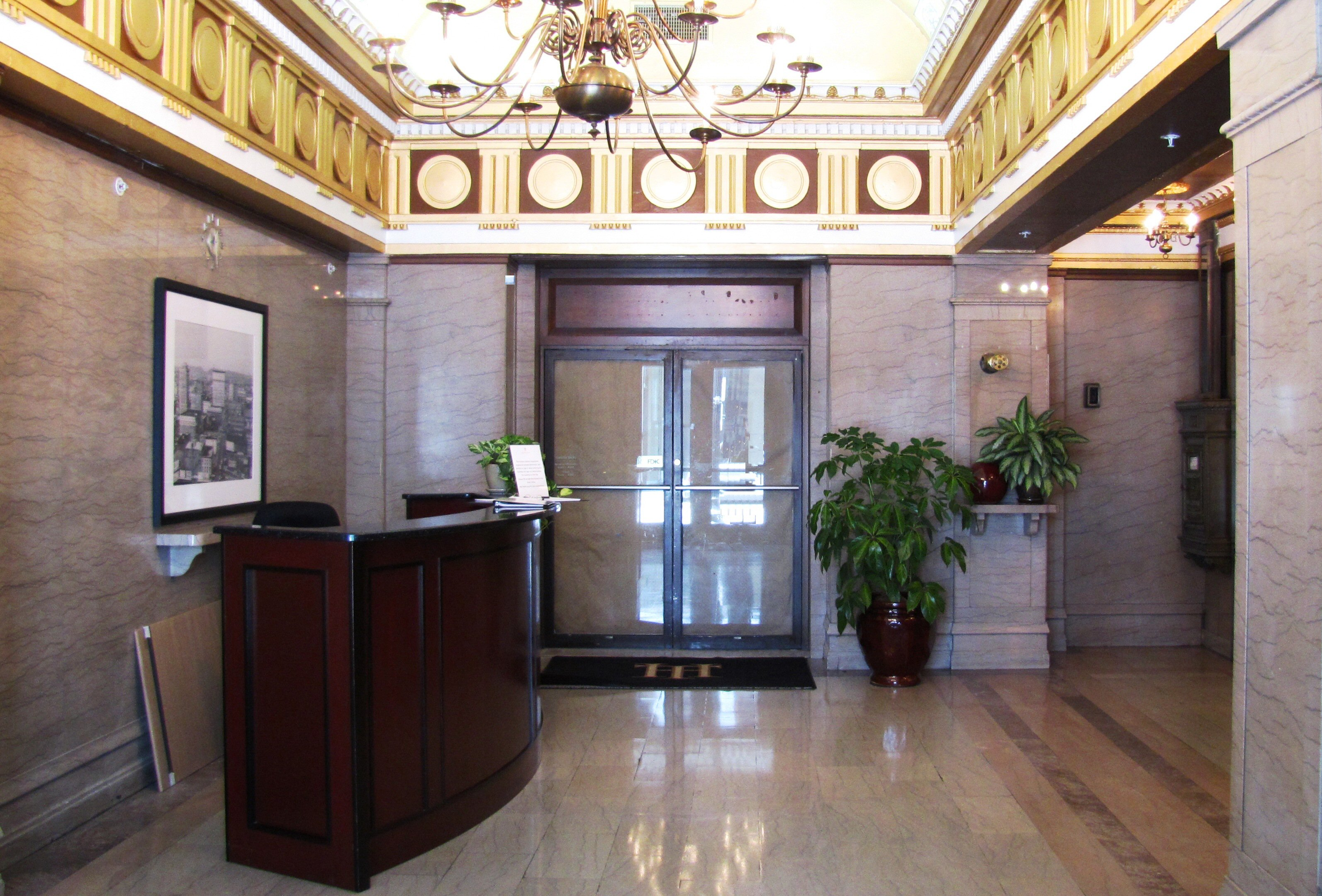
Entrance foyer in 2010

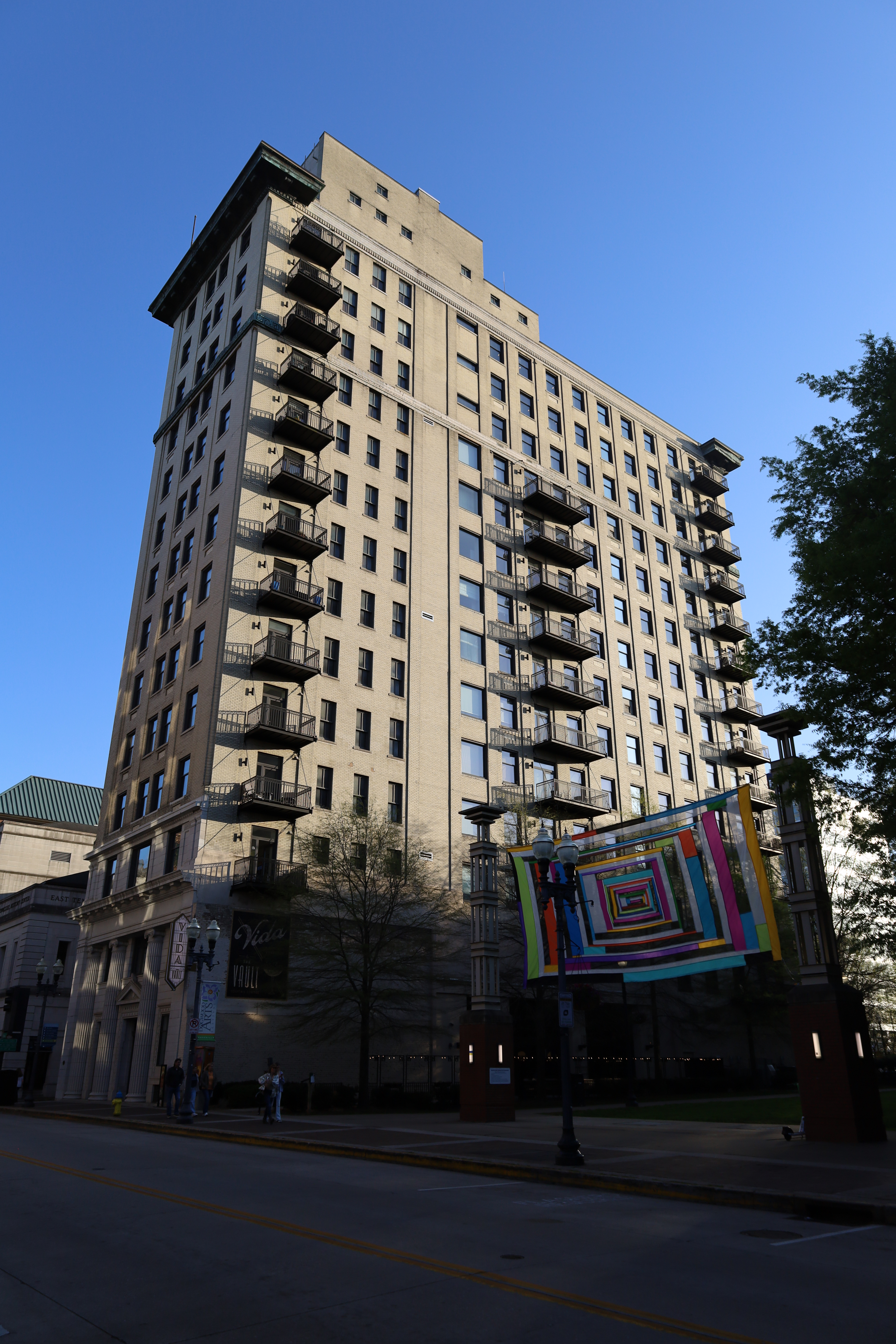
Side of the building in 2025

The Holston is a 14-story building that stands on a 50-foot (15 m) x 140-foot (43 m) lot at the northwest corner of Gay Street and Clinch Avenue. Most of the building is built with buff yellow brick, with the exception of the first three stories of the Gay Street and Clinch Avenue facades, which are sheathed in Tennessee marble. The first two stories of the Gay Street facade are slightly recessed, with four Ionic columns spanning the recess, and a central entrance topped by a pediment and the Roman numerals MDCCCCXII ("1912"). The entrance and the first-floor windows are decorated with rosettes.

The building's Clinch Avenue facade contains a row of Ionic pilasters which support an entablature adorned with triglyphs and metopes. The roof of the building is surrounded by an overhanging heavy metal cornice, which was part of the building's 1913 design and was raised to its present position in 1928 when the 13th and 14th stories were added in 1928. The edges of the cornice were originally decorated with acroterions, but these were later removed. A sculptured frieze spans the building's Gay Street and Clinch Avenue facades between the eleventh and twelfth floors.

The interior of the Holston, although heavily renovated in 1977, still contains several original elements. The entrance foyer has a vaulted ceiling with plaster rosettes, and a frieze decorated with triglyphs and metopes. The lobby originally contained Greek and Art Deco motifs, but these were removed during the 1977 renovation.

== History ==
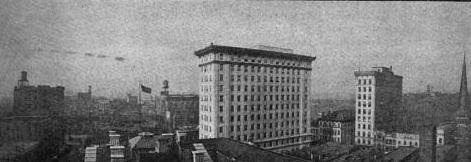
The Holston stands prominently at the center in this 1919 photograph of Knoxville's skyline

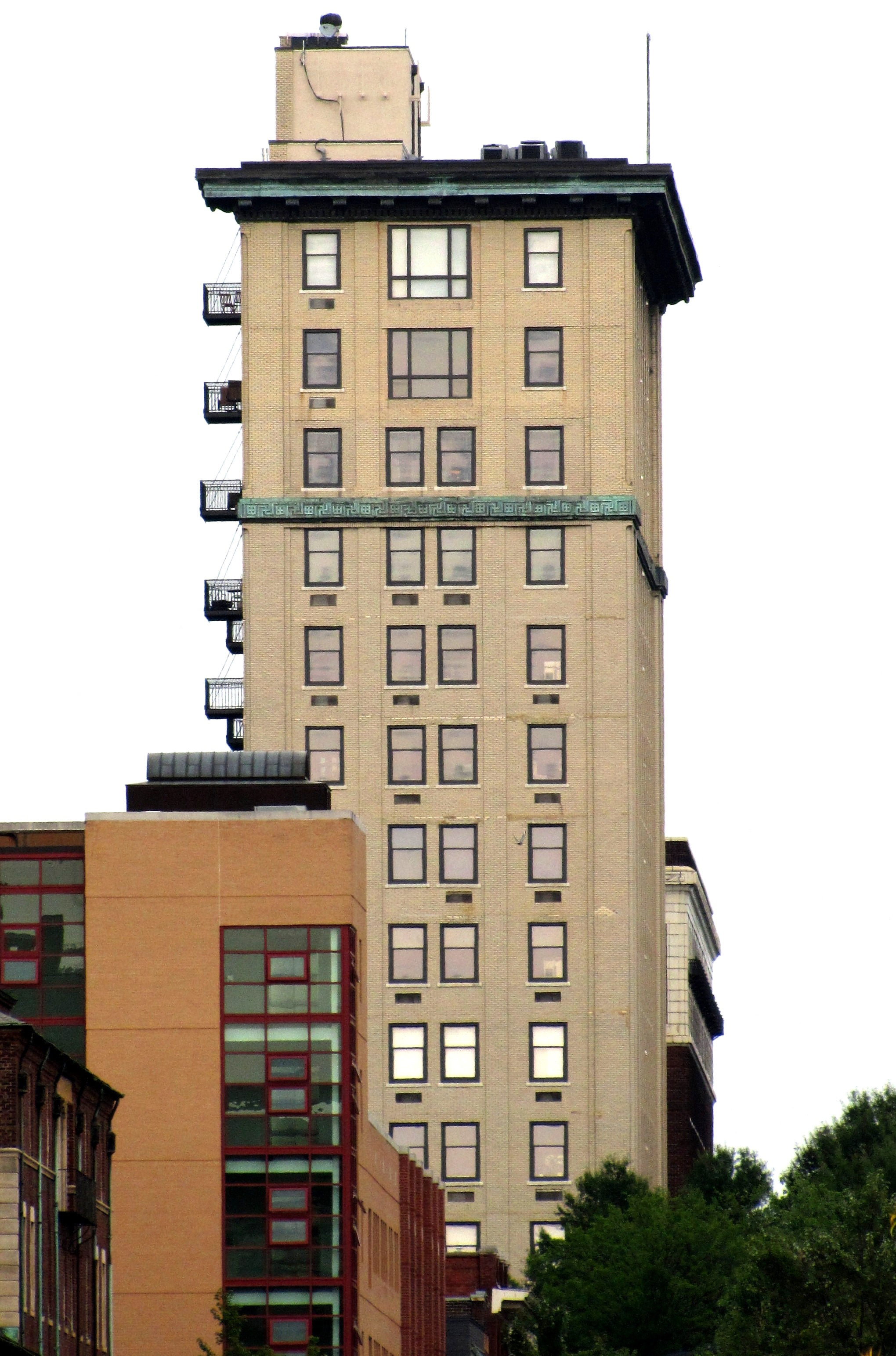
The building in 2010

The Holston National Bank was initially founded as a state-chartered bank, the Holston Banking and Trust Company, on January 17, 1890. The following year, after accumulating $100,000 of paid-in capital, the bank acquired a national charter, and reorganized as the Holston National Bank. H. M. Aiken served as the bank's first president, and was replaced by Hugh McClung in 1897. In 1900, the bank reported $100,000 in capital, $20,000 in surplus, and $250,000 in deposits, while maintaining $260,000 in loans.

In 1912, Holston National initiated construction of its new headquarters at 531 South Gay. The Holston building was designed by Norfolk, Virginia, architect John Kevan Peebles, and was built by the George A. Fuller Company of New York. The Knoxville-based Fenton Construction Company was responsible for the building's marblework, and the Nashville-based Edgefield and Nashville Manufacturing Company did the interior woodwork. The building, which opened on June 16, 1913, surpassed the Burwell (located on the opposite corner of Gay and Clinch) as Knoxville's tallest building.

In 1928, Holston National Bank merged with Union National Bank to form Holston-Union National. The bank's $16 million in assets made it by far Knoxville's largest bank. That same year, Holston's long-time president, Joseph Gaut, stepped down, and was replaced by former Union National cashier J. Basil Ramsey. On November 10, 1930, a bank run during the Great Depression generated $750,000 in withdrawal requests, and the bank was forced to close.

In 1931, the Hamilton National Bank of Knoxville opened in the Holston building as a replacement for Holston-Union. Led by president Charles Preston (whose brother, president of the Hamilton National Bank of Chattanooga, had helped organize the bank), the bank worked hard to regain the trust of Knoxvillians, many of whom had grown suspicious of banks, by ensuring that its reserves were greater than its outstanding loans. In 1940, Hamilton National controlled over half of Knoxville's banking reserves and remained the city's largest bank into the 1970s.

In late 1974, Dean Moses, president of the Memphis-based Transcom and Financial, Ltd., and Jake Butcher, president of United American Bank, both tried to seize majority control of Hamilton National Bank, igniting a bid war that caused the bank's stock price to skyrocket. In February 1975, Moses refused to match Butcher's offer of $307 per share, and on February 19, Hamilton and United American merged. The new bank built the 27-story Plaza Tower a few blocks away for its headquarters but continued to operate a branch in the Holston. Butcher's banking empire collapsed in 1983 after he was charged with bank fraud.

During the 21st century, developer Dewhirst Properties converted the Holston into a luxury condominium high-rise. In 2008, a condominium in the Holston became the first in Knoxville to sell for over $1 million.

== See also ==
- General Building
- Medical Arts Building
- The Burwell
