= Southern Terminal (Knoxville, Tennessee) =

- Southern Terminal and Warehouse Historic District
- U.S. National Register of Historic Places
- U.S. Historic district
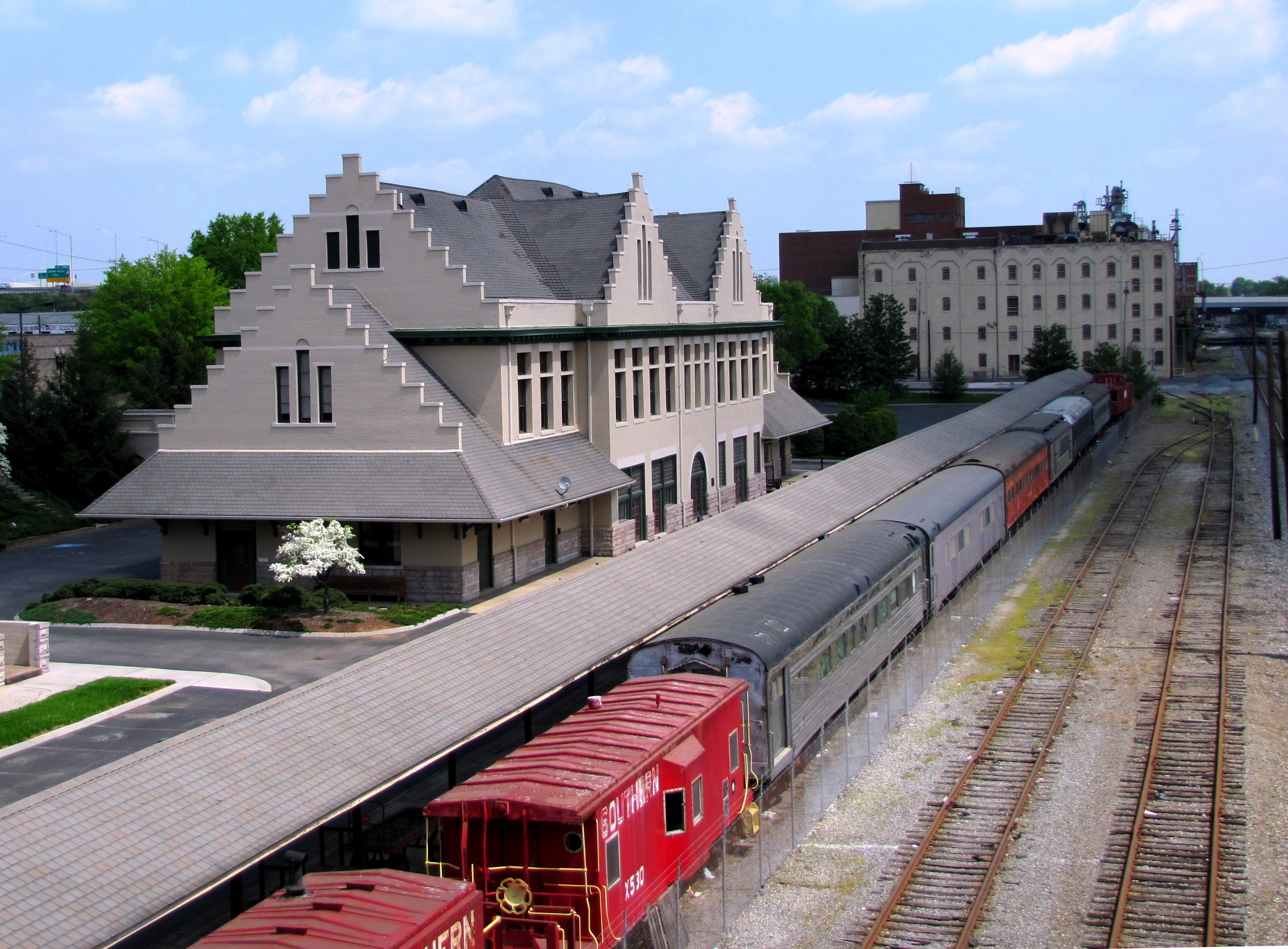
- Southern Terminal and tracks, viewed from Gay Street Viaduct

- Location within Tennessee Location within the United States
- Location: Parts of Jackson Avenue, North and South Central Street, Gay Street, State Street, Vine Avenue and Depot Avenue; Knoxville, Tennessee
- Coordinates: 35°58′10″N 83°55′12″W
- Area: approximately 33 acres (13 ha)
- Built: 1870–1935
- Architect: Frank Pierce Milburn; Et al.
- Architectural style: Chicago, Classical Revival, Romanesque Revival, Renaissance Revival, Italianate, Vernacular Commercial
- NRHP reference No.: 85002909
- Added to NRHP: November 18, 1985

The Southern Terminal is a former railway complex located at 306 West Depot Avenue in Knoxville, Tennessee, USA. The complex, which includes a passenger terminal and express depot adjacent to a large railyard, was built in 1903 by the Southern Railway. Both the terminal and depot were designed by noted train station architect Frank Pierce Milburn (1868–1926). In 1985, the terminal complex, along with several dozen warehouses and storefronts in the adjacent Old City and vicinity, were listed on the National Register of Historic Places as the Southern Terminal and Warehouse Historic District.

During the 1850s, the arrival of the railroad— namely the East Tennessee, Virginia and Georgia Railroad and its predecessor lines— transformed Knoxville from a small river town of just over 2,000 residents to one of the southeast's major wholesaling centers. Wholesaling firms built dozens of large warehouses along Jackson Avenue and adjacent streets, where smalltown merchants from across East Tennessee would purchase goods and supplies to resell at rural general stores. In 1894, the ETV&G was absorbed by the Southern Railway, which in turn became part of the Norfolk Southern Railway in 1982.

== Location ==
The Southern Terminal complex and the adjacent railyard lie at the north end of Knoxville's downtown area, occupying a natural declivity about 15 feet (4.6 m) below the adjacent street levels. The tracks run in a southwest-to-northeast direction, roughly parallel to Jackson Avenue on the south and Depot Avenue on the north. The railyard, which consists of eleven parallel tracks at its widest point, stretches from Broadway on the southwest to Central Street on the northeast. Gay Street crosses the railyard via the Gay Street Viaduct.

The terminal station and express depot sit on the north side of the tracks, at the intersection of Gay Street and Depot Avenue. Several large early-20th-century warehouses rise between Jackson Avenue and the south side of the tracks, with the buildings' loading docks facing the tracks and storefronts facing Jackson Avenue. The Old City, a neighborhood that developed along with the railroad in the latter half of the 19th century, is concentrated around the intersection of Central Street and Jackson Avenue.

== History ==
=== Early railroad development ===
Mountain barriers were an impediment to economic development in East Tennessee throughout the first half of the 19th century, and as early as the 1830s, Knoxville's leaders considered the railroad a solution to this isolation. Among the earliest proposals was the Hiwassee Railroad, conceived by several Athens, Tennessee-based businessmen, which would connect Knoxville with the Charleston and Hamburg line in Dalton, Georgia, and provide a link to the Atlantic Coast. After struggling with finances for nearly a decade, the Hiwassee was rechartered as the East Tennessee and Georgia Railroad, and construction began in 1847. The first train rolled into Knoxville on June 22, 1855.

What is now the Southern Terminal and railyard was originally a swamp known as the "Flag Pond," which Knoxvillians considered a health threat and long sought to drain. Because this swampy area provided the flattest land in Knoxville, however, the East Tennessee and Georgia chose it for the location of its Knoxville terminal and railyards. The company built a roundhouse and machine shops where the Southern Terminal complex now stands. By 1858, another rail line, the East Tennessee and Virginia Railroad, had been completed, connecting Knoxville with Bristol.

=== Civil War ===
During the Civil War, the railroad in East Tennessee provided a vital link in the supply line between Confederate forces in Virginia and the Deep South, and thus became a target of Union forces from the war's earliest days. On November 8, 1861, Unionist guerillas destroyed five railroad bridges across East Tennessee, forcing Confederate authorities to invoke martial law in the region. In June 1863, General William P. Sanders conducted a raid of the Knoxville area in which he destroyed tracks from Knoxville to Lenoir Station, and burned a railroad bridge in Strawberry Plains. In November 1863, Union forces burned the Roundhouse and machine shops to prevent Confederate forces from capturing them.

East Tennessee and Georgia president Campbell Wallace, an ardent Confederate, accused the pro-Union Knoxville Whig editor William "Parson" Brownlow of instigating the November 1861 bridge-burning conspiracy, and demanded he be hanged. After the war, when Brownlow was governor of Tennessee, he seized control of the railroad, claiming Wallace had "basely prostituted" the line to the Confederate cause. Ironically, it was an ex-Confederate, Charles McClung McGhee, who formed a syndicate which bought the East Tennessee and Georgia and the East Tennessee and Virginia lines, and merged the two into the East Tennessee, Virginia and Georgia Railroad in 1869.

=== The East Tennessee, Virginia and Georgia Railroad ===
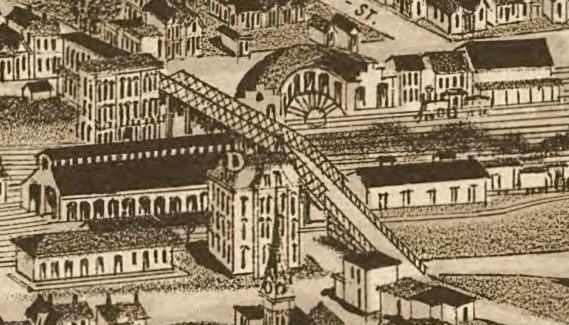
The ETV&G railyard and depot, as it appeared on an 1886 map of Knoxville

The railroad's impact on Knoxville's development was swift. The city's population more than doubled from just over 2,000 in 1850 to over 4,000 in 1860. After the war, the city's wholesaling sector expanded rapidly. By the early 1870s, the Knoxville wholesaling firm, Cowan, McClung and Company, was Tennessee's most profitable company. The railroad also brought heavy industry to the city, such as the Knoxville Iron Company, Knoxville Woolen Mills, and Brookside Mills. The railroad aided the rise the Tennessee marble industry, with eleven quarries in operation in Knox County alone by 1882.

Under the direction of McGhee and New York financier Richard T. Wilson, the ETV&G expanded rapidly. During the 1870s, the company completed lines to Kentucky and through the rugged French Broad valley into North Carolina. It also purchased lines in Georgia and Alabama. By 1890, the ETV&G controlled 2,500 miles (4,000 km) of tracks in five states. Its tracks stretched as far west as Memphis, as far southwest as Meridian, Mississippi, and Mobile, Alabama, and southeast to Brunswick, Georgia, on the Atlantic Coast.

=== The Southern Railway ===
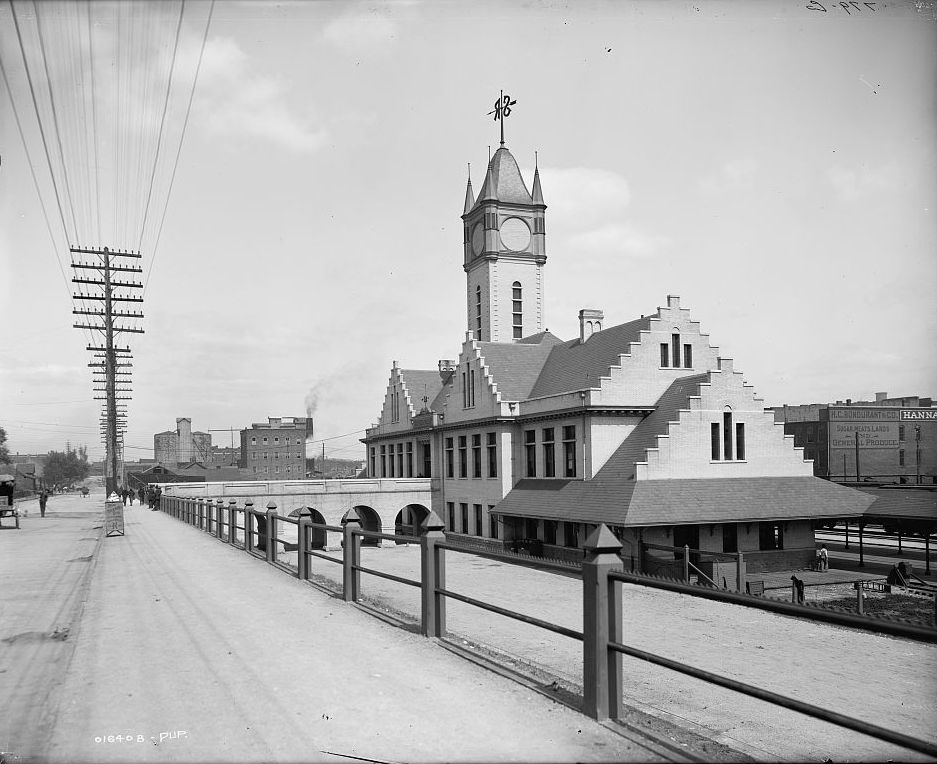
The Southern Terminal in 1906; the clock tower has since been removed

In 1894, financier J. P. Morgan and several investors purchased the ETV&G and the Richmond and Danville Railroad, and consolidated the two into the Southern Railway. The Southern immediately began making upgrades to the system's trackage and equipment, and built the Coster Repair Shops, which originally employed over 1,000 workers, and led to the development of the Oakwood neighborhood in North Knoxville. In 1925, Southern built the vast John Sevier railyard east of Knoxville, which is still used today by Norfolk Southern as a classification yard.

In 1902, Southern hired architect Frank Pierce Milburn (1868–1926) to design a series of new train stations across the South, including the new terminal in Knoxville. The new Knoxville terminal opened to the public in 1903 and the similar express depot opened in 1907. Within a year of the opening of the passenger depot, the New Market train wreck occurred several miles east of Knoxville, killing 56 passengers. An obscure Knoxville street musician named Charlie Oaks, who often played at the terminal for "nickels and dimes," wrote a song about the wreck. In 1924, Oaks became one of the earliest musicians to commercially record what is now country music. On January 20, 1953, the last Southern Railway steam-powered passenger train arrived in Knoxville, Tennessee.

At its height, the Southern Terminal was servicing 26 passenger trains daily. With the rise of automobile and bus travel, however, passenger rail service declined. After World War II, the Southern was operating eight expresses and twelve local lines out of Knoxville.

=== Named passenger trains ===
By 1956, the local lines had been eliminated, and most of the expresses were eliminated by the late 1960s. By August, 1969 only the Birmingham Special remained serving the station. That train was the last regularly scheduled passenger train at the terminal on August 12, 1970.

Preceding station	Southern Railway	Following station
Bearden toward Memphis	Memphis – Bristol	Caswell toward Bristol
Black Oak toward Fonde	Fonde – Knoxville	Terminus
Harriman Junction toward Oakdale	Oakdale – Knoxville	Terminus
Terminus	Knoxville – Middlesboro	Coster toward Middlesboro

== Southern Terminal and Warehouse Historic District ==
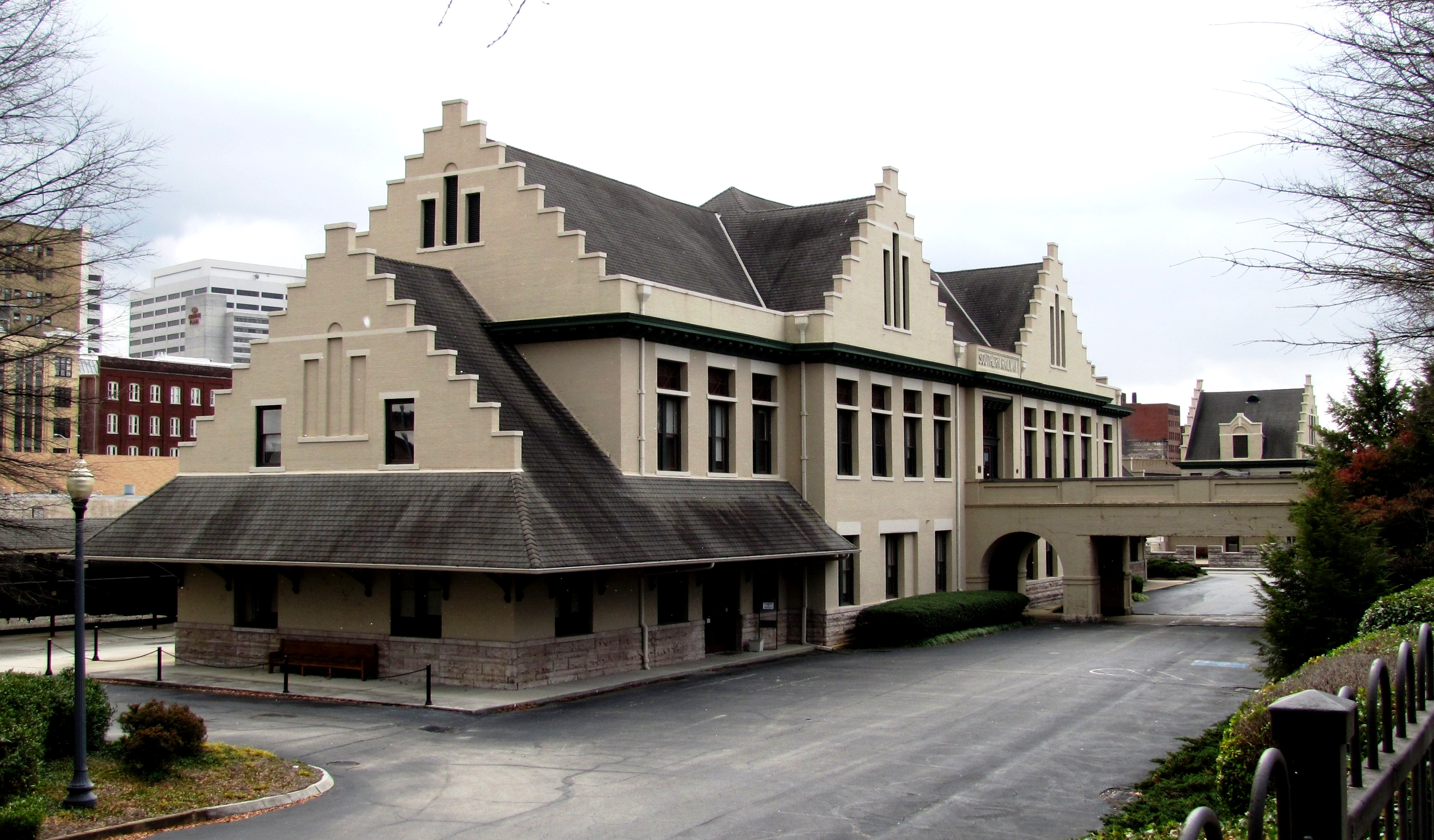
The Southern Terminal, viewed from Depot Avenue

The Southern Terminal and Warehouse Historic District was listed on the National Register of Historic Places in 1985 for its late-19th- and early-20th-century commercial architecture and its role in Knoxville's railroad-based commerce and wholesaling industry. The district includes the Southern Terminal complex, all of West Jackson Avenue, the 100 blocks of East Jackson, North and South Central, and South Gay, parts of State Street and Vine Avenue, and the former White Lily plant on Depot. Several buildings in the district, namely Sullivan's Saloon (100 E. Jackson) and the warehouse buildings at 121–123, 122–124, 125–127, and 129-131 West Jackson, were previously listed on the Register in the 1970s as the Jackson Avenue Warehouse District.

There were originally 75 contributing buildings and structures in the Southern Terminal district, although some of these are no longer standing. The listing included the old Gay Street Viaduct, which was demolished and replaced by the current viaduct in 2005. Other non-extant listings include an 1870s-era freight depot once located at 406 West Jackson (now a parking lot), and several warehouse buildings on West Jackson's 500-block. In 2004, the Southern Terminal district was extended to include the Southeastern Glass Building at 100 North Broadway.

=== Southern Passenger Terminal and Express Depot ===
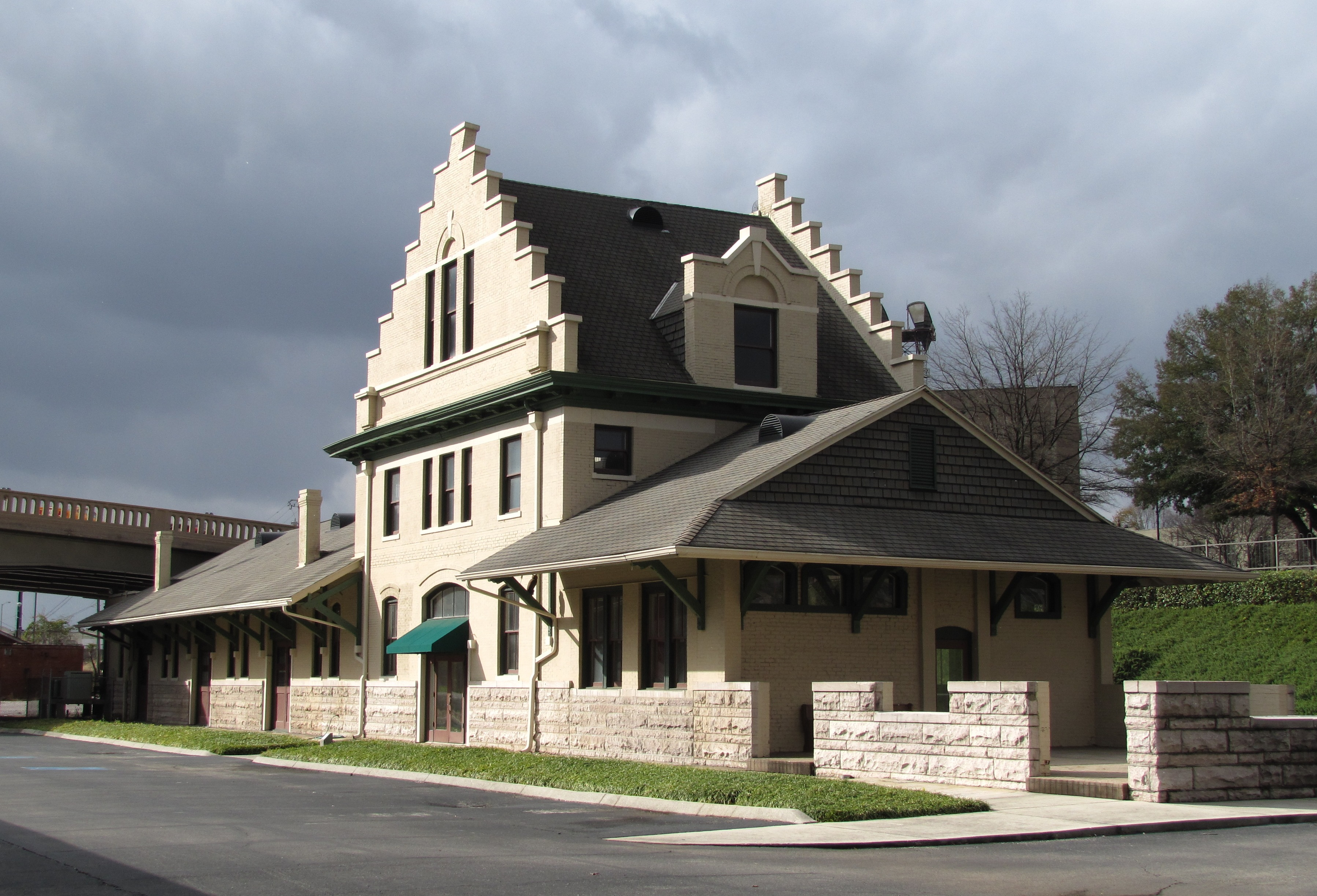
The Southern Railway Express Depot

The passenger terminal station and express depot, both designed in the same vernacular style with Classical Revival influence, were completed in 1903 and 1907, respectively, and are notable for their signature corbel-stepped gabled roofs. The terminal building is two-and-a-half stories, with the lower level originally containing the dining rooms, baggage check, express and mail rooms, and the upper level originally housing the ticketing and waiting rooms. A bridge connects the upper level with Depot Avenue. The building originally included a clock tower, which was removed in 1945, apparently due to structural problems.

The express depot consists of a 2 1/2-story central section flanked by two 1-story wings. The design of the central section matches the design of the adjacent passenger terminal building. Part of the depot's east wing has been removed to create an open courtyard. The main terminal building is now used for office space while the express depot is used as a meeting venue by a local caterer.

=== Patrick Sullivan's Saloon ===
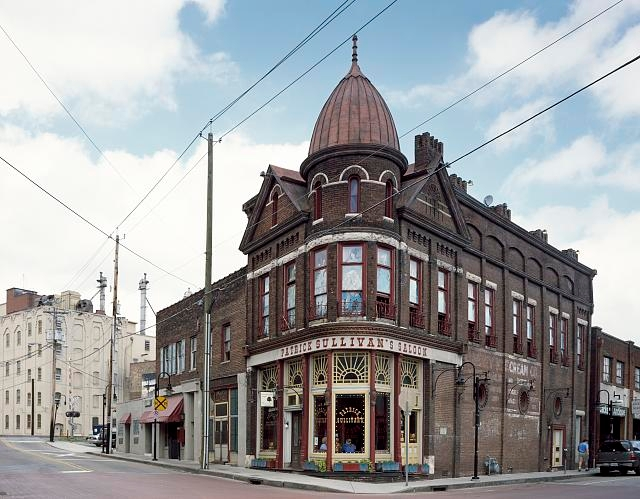
Patrick Sullivan's Saloon

Sullivan's Saloon (100 E. Jackson) is a two-story Romanesque Revival building with Queen Anne elements constructed by saloonkeeper Patrick Sullivan (1841–1925) in 1888. Sullivan, who immigrated from Ireland with his parents in the 1850s, established his saloon in what is now the Old City just after the Civil War. The saloon initially operated out of a wooden building before being replaced by the current elaborate brick structure. The building housed a saloon until 1907, when it was forced to close due to citywide Prohibition. The saloon was home to Patrick Sullivan's Steakhouse and Saloon from 1988 to 2011. The building has been called the "best extant example of a downtown saloon in the southeastern United States." The building was sold early in 2014 and as of August 2014 was undergoing a significant exterior and interior renovation.

=== Other notable buildings ===
- 200 East Jackson, a two-story Vernacular Commercial warehouse building, constructed circa 1910.
- 121-123 West Jackson, sometimes called the Carhart Building, a 3 1/2-story brick warehouse building with a Romanesque Revival facade, built around 1900. The Carhart Building was designed by the Knoxville architectural firm, Baumann Brothers, and is named for H.B. Carhart and Company, a grocery wholesaler established in 1877. 121 West Jackson is currently home to Crush, a shop that specializes in retro rock fashion.
- 120-122 West Jackson, a five-story vernacular brick warehouse building constructed circa 1900.
- 124 West Jackson, a five-story brick warehouse building with Romanesque Revival facade constructed circa 1900. This building may have originally been occupied by Powers, Little and Company, a clothing wholesaler established in 1892.
- 125 West Jackson, a 3.5-story brick building with a Classical Revival facade, constructed circa 1890. During the 1890s, this building was occupied by two wholesale grocers, Hazen and Lotspeich, and Knaffl and Locke, the latter cofounded by Rudolph Knaffl, a brother of photographer Joseph Knaffl. Its current tenants include Remedy Coffee.

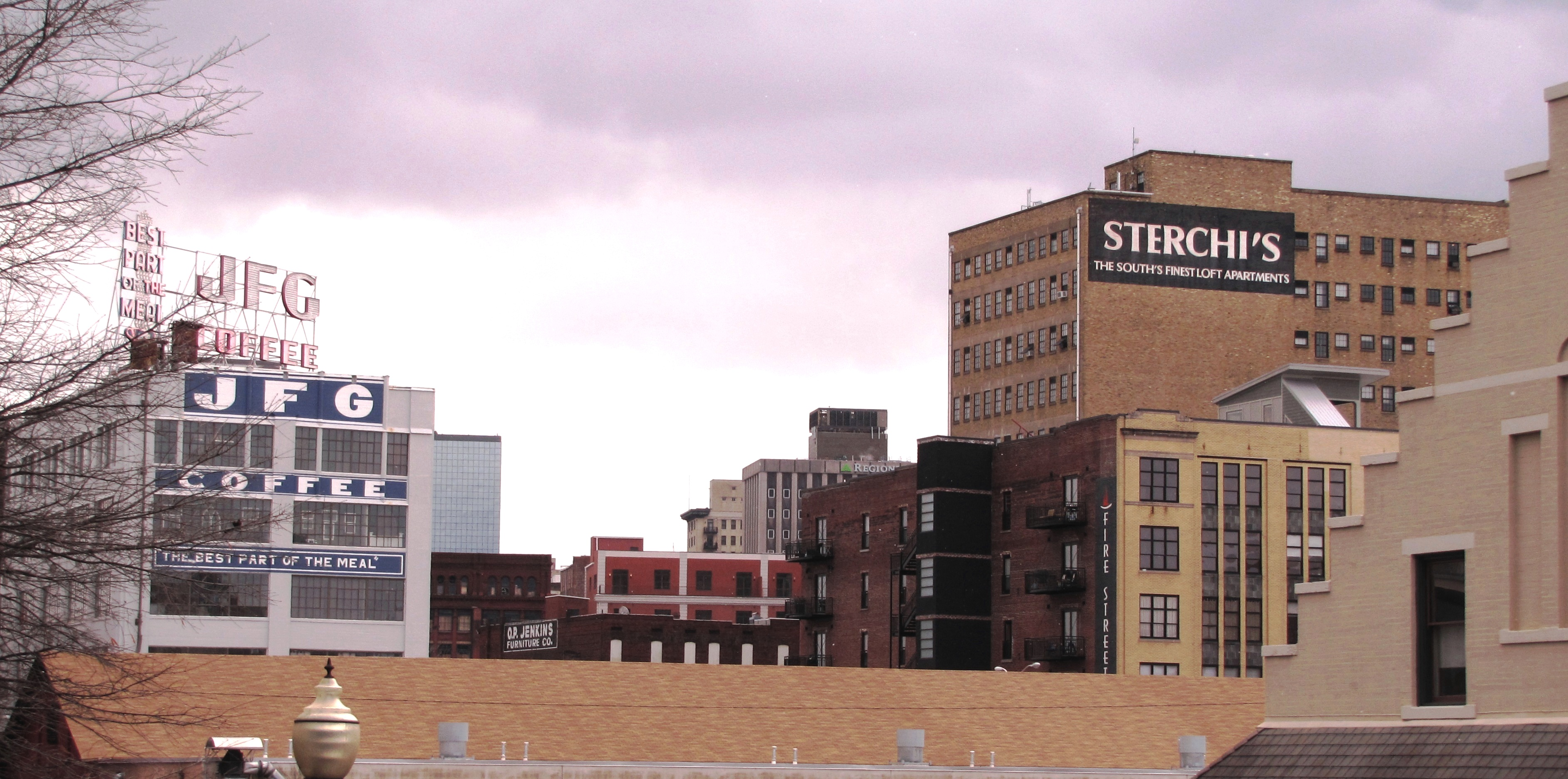
JFG Flats and Sterchi Lofts, both originally constructed as warehouses, now house loft apartments

- JFG Flats (200 West Jackson), a six-story concrete building constructed in 1920, and used for several decades by the JFG Coffee Company. The company's large neon sign still stands atop the building, which now houses residential flats.
- 203 West Jackson, a one-story, 20-bay brick freight depot originally constructed circa 1870. In the late 1990s, this building was extensively renovated.
- McClung Warehouses (501-525 West Jackson), built for the wholesale firm, C.M. McClung and Company. The buildings at 517-521 were constructed between 1893 and 1927. Several of the warehouse buildings burned in 2007. Another two alarm blaze engulfed additional portions of the McClung Warehouses on 1 February 2014 and the City of Knoxville was forced to demolish one of the remaining structures.
- The Emporium Building (102-106 South Gay), a three-story Renaissance Revival warehouse constructed in 1898 by the Sterchi Brothers Company, a regional furniture wholesaler.
- Sterchi Lofts (114-116 South Gay), a ten-story warehouse and office building constructed in 1925 and designed by architect R. F. Graf. The building was used as a warehouse until the late 20th century by the furniture company, Sterchi Brothers, and now houses downtown residential lofts.
- Commerce Building (120-126 South Gay), a four-story Italianate building constructed in the early 1890s.
- White Lily Foods Company building (106 Depot), a four-story brick factory originally constructed in 1885 and experienced routine expansions. White Lily operated out of this building until 2008. The building has been converted into loft apartments that first opened in February 2015.
- The 100 blocks of North and South Central contain nearly two dozen commercial buildings constructed circa 1880—1925, ranging from one to three stories. These buildings were once part of a vice-ridden section of Knoxville known as "The Bowery," which once stretched along Central from the tracks to the river. Most of these buildings were renovated in the 1980s and 1990s, and the neighborhood was renamed the "Old City."

== See also ==
- Battle of Depot Street
- L&N Station (Knoxville)
- Smoky Mountain Railroad
