= Old City, Knoxville =

- Southern Terminal and Warehouse Historic District
- U.S. National Register of Historic Places
- U.S. Historic district
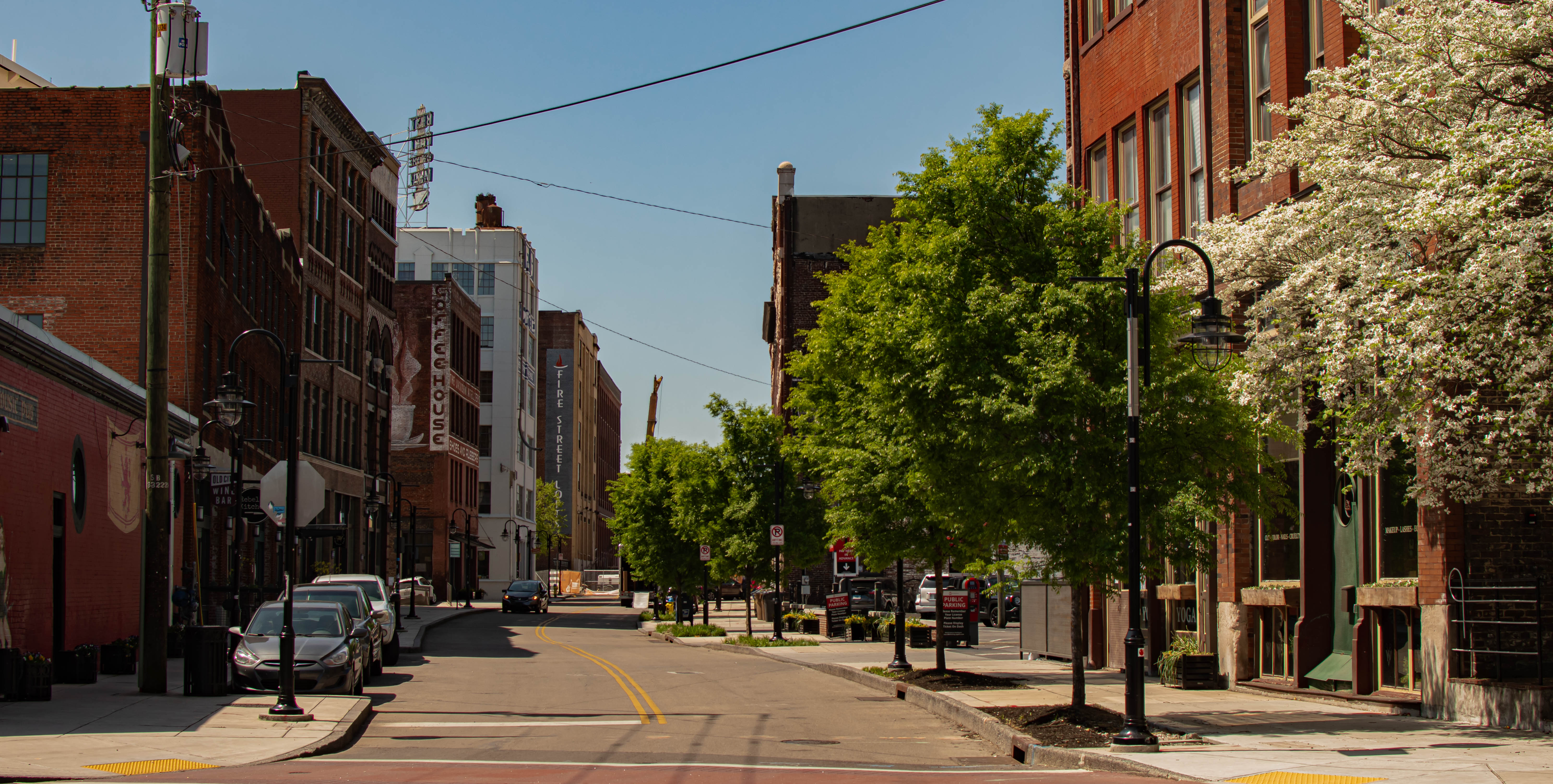
- East Jackson Ave, in the Old City neighborhood

- Location within Tennessee Location within the United States
- Location: Parts of Jackson Avenue, North and South Central Street, Gay Street, State Street, Vine Avenue and Depot Avenue; Knoxville, Tennessee
- Coordinates: 35°58′13″N 83°55′6″W
- Area: approximately 33 acres (13 ha)
- Built: 1870–1935
- Architect: Frank Pierce Milburn; Et al.
- Architectural style: Chicago, Classical Revival, Romanesque Revival, Renaissance Revival, Italianate, Vernacular Commercial
- NRHP reference No.: 85002909
- Added to NRHP: November 18, 1985

The Old City is a neighborhood in Knoxville, Tennessee, United States, located at the northeast corner of the city's downtown area. Originally part of a raucous and vice-ridden section of town known as "The Bowery," the Old City has since been revitalized through extensive redevelopment efforts carried out during the 1980s through the present. Currently, the Old City is an offbeat urban neighborhood, home to several unique restaurants, bars, clubs, and shops.

In spite of its name, the Old City is not the oldest section of Knoxville. Most of the neighborhood was not part of the city until the 1850s, when the arrival of the railroad encouraged the city to annex the areas north of Vine Avenue. The railroad brought an influx of Irish immigrants, who established the Old City's first saloons and shops. After the Civil War, Knoxville developed into one of the southeast's largest wholesaling centers. Wholesalers built large warehouses, such as the ones along Jackson Avenue, where rural East Tennessee merchants came to buy the goods with which they stocked their general stores.

By the early 1900s, Central Street was lined with saloons and brothels. Violent crime and prostitution continued to be a problem into the 1960s, causing many of the neighborhood's businesses to flee the area. Beginning in 1986, successful redevelopment efforts led by Architect Peter Calandruccio and Builder Benny Curl revitalized the neighborhood. Calandruccio's master-planning (see below) prompted other developers to begin work on other properties as the opportunity of broad-scaled development showed itself promising.

== Location ==
The Old City is concentrated around the intersection of Central Street and Jackson Avenue, adjacent to the Southern Terminal tracks and railyard (now part of the Norfolk Southern system). The neighborhood is roughly bounded by Magnolia Avenue on the north, Gay Street on the west, Summit Hill Drive on the south, and the interstate overpasses on the east. Interstate 40 passes just north of the Old City, and is accessible via the Downtown Loop from Summit Hill Drive.

== History ==
=== 19th century ===
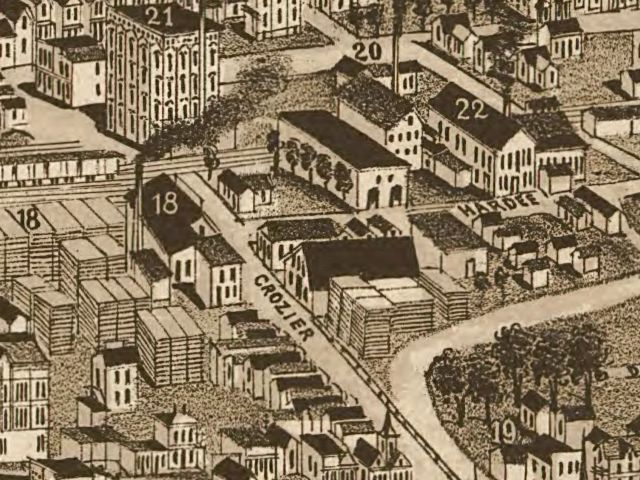
Detail of an 1886 map of Knoxville, showing what is now the Old City; "Crozier" is now Central Street. Building #21, the White Lily factory, is still standing.

During the first half of the 19th century, Knoxville's northward expansion was slow. By 1852, Vine Avenue marked the city's northern limits. The establishment of Market Square in 1854 and the arrival of the railroad in 1855 catalyzed development north of the city, however, and by the end of 1855 the city's limits had pushed northward to what is now Emory Place.

The arrival of the railroad had a major impact on the city's cultural makeup, as hundreds of Irish immigrants arrived in town to help construct the railroad tracks and facilities. Many of these immigrants settled in what is now the Old City, so much so that at one point the area was known as "Irish Town." After the Civil War, Irish businessmen began building saloons and shops along Central (originally Crozier) Street that served the city's railroad traffic. Among these businesses was a saloon built by Patrick Sullivan (1840—1925), which initially operated out of a wooden structure before Sullivan erected the elaborate brick building that still stands at the corner of Central and Jackson.

In 1869, Knoxville's two main rail lines merged to form the East Tennessee, Virginia and Georgia Railroad, which in subsequent years constructed or acquired over 2,500 miles (4,000 km) of track across the southeast, leading to a wholesaling and industrial boom in the city. By 1886, several factories had moved into the Old City. The Burr and Terry Sash Factory stood at what is now the intersection of Central and Jackson. The four-story City Mills (later White Lily) plant and the Beach's Marble Works finishing mill stood along Depot, and the Elridge Carriage Factory operated near the modern corner of Central and Summit Hill.

=== Early 1900s ===
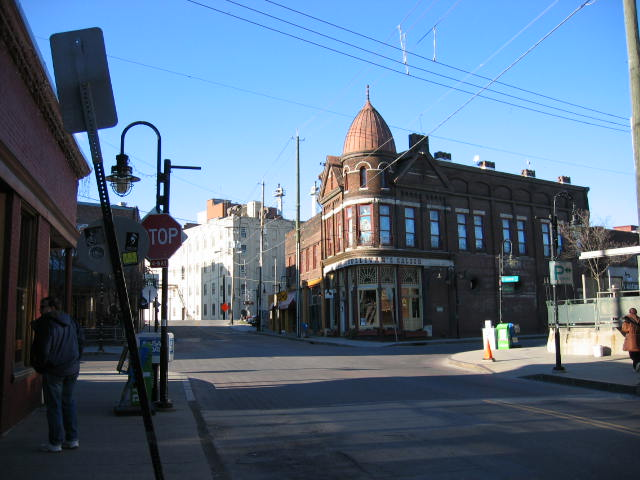
Intersection of South Central Street and West Jackson Avenue. The Patrick Sullivan's building now houses an upscale restaurant called The Lonesome Dove.

By the early 1900s, Central Street had developed into a raucous area known as "The Bowery," presumably after the New York neighborhood of similar repute. A 1900 article described the Bowery as being "congregated by nine-tenths of the criminal element" of Knoxville, and according to historian Jack Neely, "saloons, whorehouses, cocaine parlors, gambling dens, and poolrooms" lined Central from the tracks to the river. Florida Street, which ran adjacent to Central prior to expressway construction, developed into a red-light district known as "Friendly Town."

Bar fights and shootouts were not uncommon at the Bowery's saloons. The most well-known of the Bowery's gunfights occurred at Ike Jones' bar on Central on December 13, 1901, when outlaw Kid Curry (a member of Butch Cassidy's Wild Bunch) shot two Knoxville police officers. Curry was eventually captured and jailed, but managed to escape. The shooting became a rallying cry for the city's prohibitionists, who shouted down Knoxville mayor Samuel Heiskell with chants of "Harvey Logan" (Curry's real name) during a rally on Market Square in 1907.

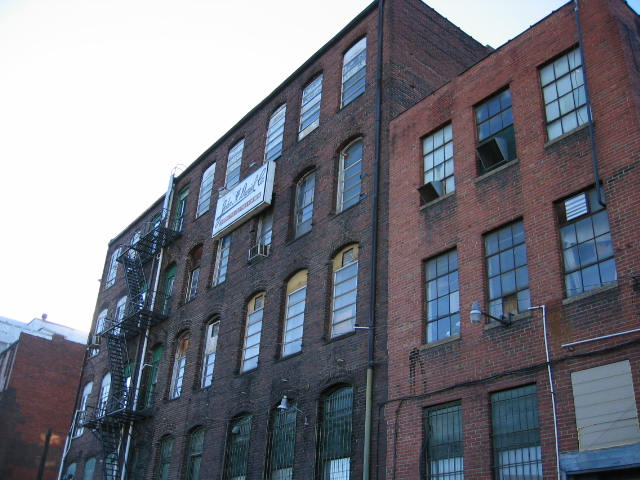
John H. Daniel Building, pre-renovation. Now open as "The Daniel", upscale rental lofts with ground floor retail.

Peace Corps "progenitor" James Herman Robinson (1907–1972) grew up in a polluted and disease-ridden slum known as "The Bottoms," which lay adjacent to the Bowery on the banks of First Creek. In his autobiography, Road Without Turning, Robinson describes the Bottoms as the "lowest" part of Knoxville, "geographically, morally, and economically." He later joined a gang which hung out at the corner of Central and Vine, where they witnessed "every lewd act and heard every vile phrase descriptive of it."

While the Bowery was one of the most crime-ridden sections of Knoxville, it was also one of the most diverse, and was one of the few parts of town where black-owned businesses functioned next to white-owned businesses. Black-owned businesses in the neighborhood included the Gem Theater, the Dogan-Gaither Motel, Gleaner Printing Company, and Easley's Grocery. In the early 1900s, Greek immigrant Constantine Stergiokis opened one of Knoxville's first Greek restaurants along Central. After citywide prohibition shut down Knoxville's saloons, the Italian-American Armetta family opened an ice cream parlor in the Sullivan building.

Part of the Knoxville Riot of 1919, one of the city's worst racial episodes, took place in the Bowery on August 30, 1919. Early that morning, a white woman was murdered, and police arrested Maurice Mays, a prominent local mulatto, for the crime. That afternoon, a lynch mob broke into the jail, and failing to find Mays, freed several inmates and looted the liquor storage room. As the riot spread into the streets, the rioters made their way to the Bowery, where they attacked and exchanged gunfire with black residents along Vine Avenue. The National Guard finally restored order the following morning.

=== Revitalization ===
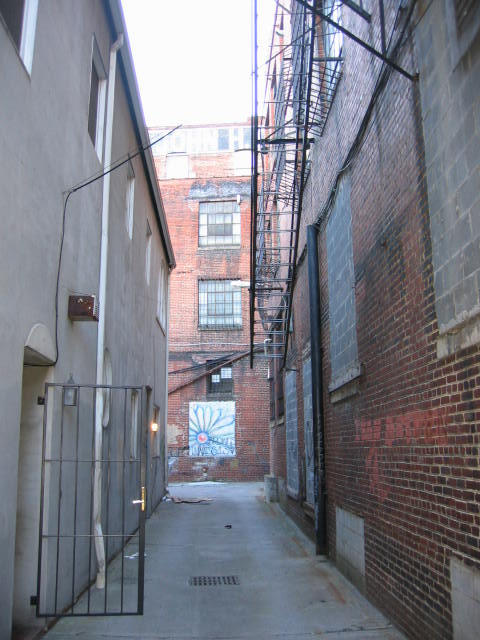
This alley off of South Central Street is home to several apartments.

As crime persisted in the Bowery, businesses began moving away. In the 1940s, JFG Coffee, which had opened its processing plant on West Jackson in 1921, threatened to move to a new location, complaining that the company's truck drivers were consistently mobbed by prostitutes. Walter McGinnis, who operated the Tri-City Barber College at the corner of Jackson and Central from 1952 until 1992, recalled that, "Saturday at noon, the sawmills would close, and the people who worked in the forest would come to South Central. By 5 o'clock that night they were all pretty drunk and fightin.'"

Several scenes in Cormac McCarthy's 1979 novel, Suttree, take place in the Old City. In one scene, the title character passes along Central, where "loud and shoddy commerce erupted out of the dim shops into the streets and packs of scarred dogs wandered," en route to sell his fish to a Central Street butcher. In another scene, a friend of Suttree's tells a story about a murderer showing off his victim's severed head at a bar on Central. The book also mentions the "Corner Grill" (later the Corner Lounge), which operated on North Central from the 1930s until 2008.

During the 1970s restaurant owner Kris Kendrick began buying random individual properties in the area, but had no particularly cohesive vision for the district. In 1986 Architect Peter Calandruccio began a visionary master planning and development undertaking. Acquiring strategic properties oriented around the intersection of Central and Jackson streets, he brought to the district a sense of place and orientation. After setting-up multiple partnerships with which he acquired some 9 properties as a critical mass he embarked on securing financing for his ventures. Simultaneously, he secured a long-term lease for the relocation of Hewgley's Music, a Knoxville institution specializing in the sale of musical instruments, as a vital anchor tenant for his flagship 40,000 s.f. mixed-use property at the NW corner of the intersection of Jackson and Central, naming it "Hewgley Park". Calandruccio teamed-up with builder, Benny Curl to undertake the renovation/preservation of the historic buildings for re-use, Curl's specialty as a builder. Curl also acquired and developed the pivotal corner opposite Hewgley Park as a restaurant he called Manhattan's - the former name of a former establishment at that location. Manhattan's became a thriving first-start gathering spot and Curl's construction crew worked doggedly on multiple builder restorations simultaneously as the district's popularity exploded. Calandruccio set-up and presided over the "Old City Neighborhood Association" as new businesses began to open. To improve overall infrastructure Calandruccio applied for and secured a $1.2m federal Urban Development Action Grant for the placement of overhead utility wires underground, new sidewalks, landscaping, and new outdoor lighting. With this focused vision, he was able to gain critical publicity for the bringing-in of other developers, tenants, and residents to the area, thus setting in motion the revitalization that stimulated the rebirth of Knoxville's Central Business District. Most noteworthy in addition to Hewgley's Music was Calandruccio's work with Ashley Capps in starting the now renowned "Ella Guru's" live music venue. Capps and Calandruccio's friendship had started over their love of music and together they set music as the focal theme of the Old City. Some of the other memorable initial new businesses included "Annie's Restaurant" by Annie Delisle (novelist Cormac McCarthy's ex-wife), Old City Mercantile, Kerby's Antiques, Sullivan's Saloon, and Java Coffee Shop. From the work of these early entrepreneurs came what is now the bustling Old City.

== Economy ==
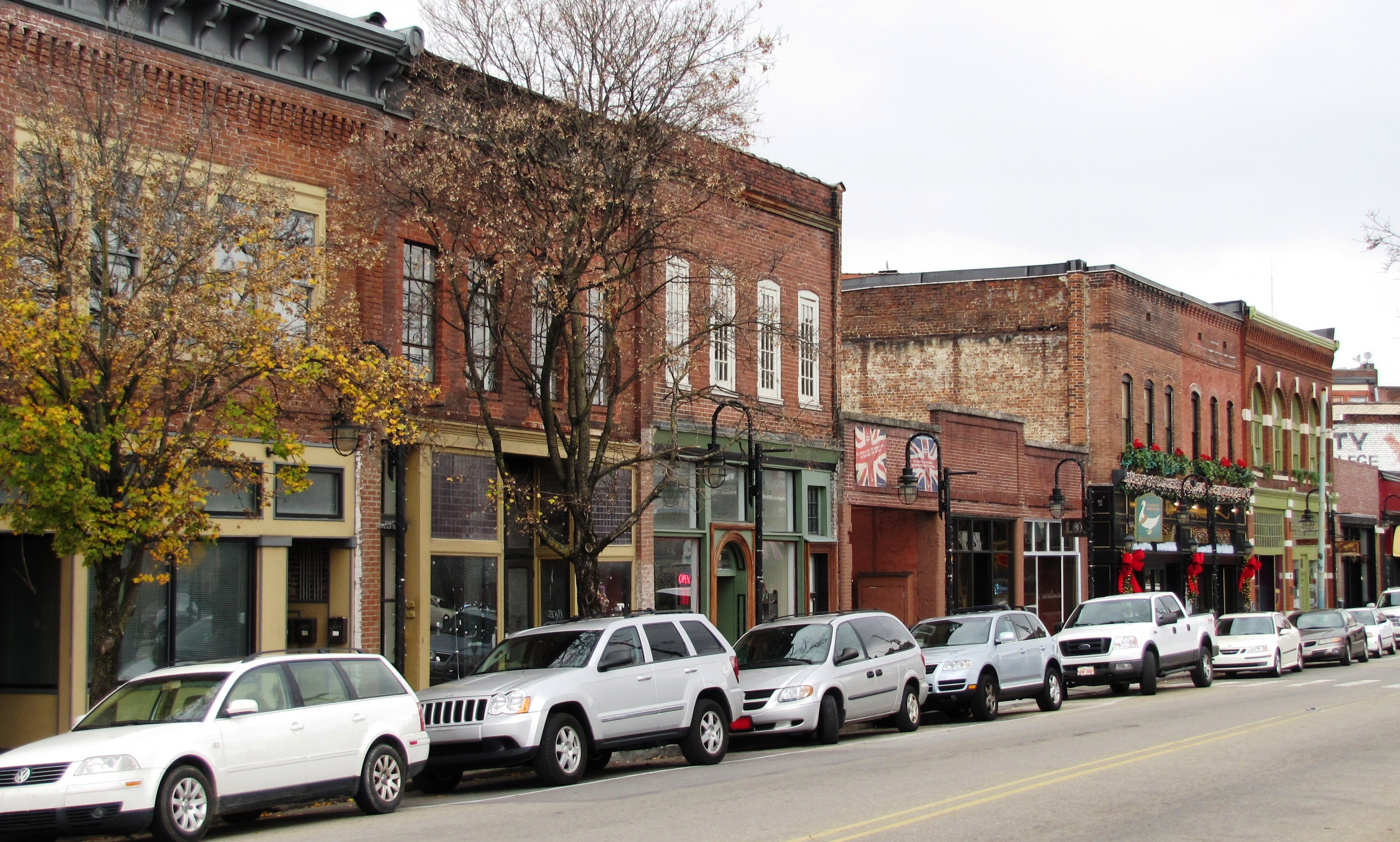
South Central's 100 block

Now considered the "club district" of Knoxville (currently no strip clubs), the Old City is generally made up of warehouses, buildings of light industrial use, and a small historically commercial strip along South Central Street. The White Lily Foods plant, which had operated since 1885, shut down in 2008. JFG Coffee was for decades located in several buildings in the Old City, but moved in 2007. The former JFG roasting facility at 200 West Jackson Avenue was redeveloped into the JFG Flats residential lofts in 2009, and the White Lily Foods building was purchased in 2012 by the same company that developed the roasting facility (Dewhirst Properties). It reopened as residential rental apartments in 2015. John H. Daniel Company, a custom tailoring company, operated on West Jackson from 1928 to 2016 when they moved north of downtown on Central St. The building was sold to developers and reconfigured as rental loft apartments with retail storefronts on the first floor. It is called "The Daniel", and opened to tenants late in 2016.

There are several loft apartments in the older buildings of the Old City, many located behind and above offices and stores. The Jackson Ateliers Building and Hewgley Park lofts have been residential locations for many years. The Jacksonian Condos, JFG Flats, and Fire Street Lofts, have been redeveloped more recently as upscale condominiums, some listing in excess of $600,000.

The area tends to attract young single adults, who are sometimes affiliated with the University of Tennessee, which is less than two miles away. The Old City's proximity to entertainment and nightlife make it an attractive place to live for many young adults.

== See also ==
- Battle of Depot Street
- Jackson Avenue Warehouse District
- South Market Historic District
