= Cornelius C. Howell =

American businessman and politician (1848–1902)

Cornelius C. Howell (March 22, 1848 – May 2, 1902) was an American businessman and politician, active in Ohio, Colorado, and Tennessee. He was prominent in the development of Leadville, Colorado and Findlay, Ohio, and later established himself in Knoxville, Tennessee, where he took over a portion of the city's streetcar system and was with William Gibbs McAdoo one of the two key antagonists in the so-called Battle of Depot Street in that city in 1897. He was elected to the Tennessee state senate in 1900 from Knox County as a Republican.

He died in Phoenix, Arizona on May 2, 1902.
