= Chamberlain Field =

Former stadium in Chattanooga, Tennessee

- Interactive map of Chamberlain Field
- Location: Oak Street at Baldwin Street; Chattanooga, Tennessee
- Coordinates: 35°2′48.5874″N 85°17′57.5874″W
- Owner: University of Tennessee at Chattanooga
- Operator: University of Tennessee at Chattanooga
- Capacity: 10,501
- Surface: Natural grass

Construction
- Opened: 1908
- Closed: 1997

Tenants
- Chattanooga Mocs (1908–1997); Chattanooga Lookouts baseball (1909)

Chamberlain Field was an American football stadium in Chattanooga, Tennessee. It hosted the University of Tennessee at Chattanooga football team until they moved to Finley Stadium in 1997. It officially opened on June 3, 1908, and was named in honor of former University of Chattanooga trustee Hiram Sanborn Chamberlain. When it closed, it was the second-oldest on-campus college football stadium after Harvard Stadium. In 2011, Chamberlain Field was disassembled, with its materials being used to construct Chamberlain Pavilion.

The field was on the university campus, with boundaries Oak Street (south); Baldwin Street / Campus Drive (east); Vine Street (north); and Douglas Street (west). The original main stands were on the south, bordering Oak Street. The original baseball field's diamond was in the southeast corner of the lot. Google Maps indicates the area is now a Quadrangle, an open field surrounded by campus buildings.

The stadium held 10,501 people at its peak. Its Vine Street and Oak Street grandstands were demolished in 2004 and August 2011 respectively.

Opening day professional baseball game, 1909
