= Hiram Sanborn Chamberlain =

American military officer and industrialist (1835–1916)

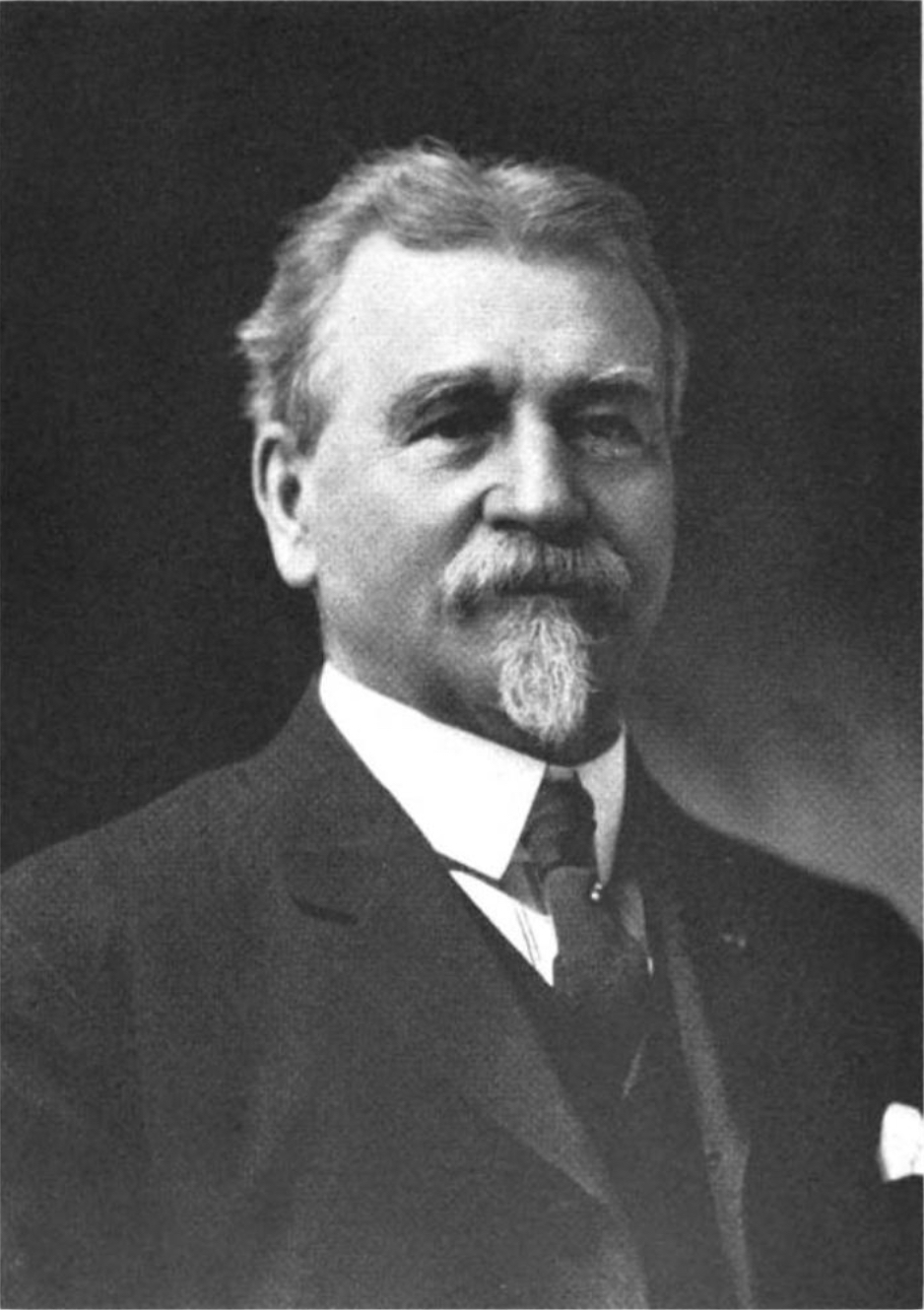
- Chamberlain in a 1923 publication
- Born: August 6, 1835; Franklin, Ohio, US
- Died: March 15, 1916 (aged 80); Chattanooga, Tennessee, US
- Education: Hiram College
- Children: 6
- Military career
- Allegiance: United States
- Branch: Union army
- Rank: Quartermaster general
- Units: 2nd Ohio Cavalry Regiment; XXIII Corps
- Conflicts: American Civil War; Knoxville campaign; Atlanta campaign; Chattanooga campaign
- Other work: Industrialist

Hiram Sanborn Chamberlain Sr. (August 6, 1835 – March 15, 1916) was an American industrialist and military officer. During the American Civil War, he served as a quartermaster general for the Union Army. He later became a businessman, and is credited with establishing the iron and steel industry in the Southern United States during the Reconstruction era.

== Early life and military career ==
Chamberlain was born on August 6, 1835, in Franklin, Ohio, the fourth of eight children of Leander and Susanna Chamberlain (née Willey), who were originally from Vermont. Of English origin, he was descendant of Richard Warren, a Mayflower passenger. He grew up on a farm in Cuyahoga County, Ohio. He and a brother were businessmen in Iowa in 1858 and 1859, then he returned to Ohio and attended Hiram College. There, he studied under James A. Garfield, who he befriended. He was also an educator while in Ohio.

On August 24, 1861, Chamberlain enlisted into Company B of the 2nd Ohio Cavalry Regiment to fight in the American Civil War. Originally stationed between Kansas and Missouri, he rose from his enlisted rank of private, to divisional quartermaster. As divisional quartermaster, he served under Ambrose Burnside in the Knoxville campaign. He was promoted was to captain and assistant quartermaster general in September 1863, by Abraham Lincoln. As captain, he commanded XXIII Corps under John Schofield in the Atlanta and Chattanooga campaigns. His last promotion was to quartermaster general under George Stoneman. As quartermaster general, he commanded forces in North Carolina, Tennessee, and Virginia. On October 26, 1865, he retired from the military.

== Career ==
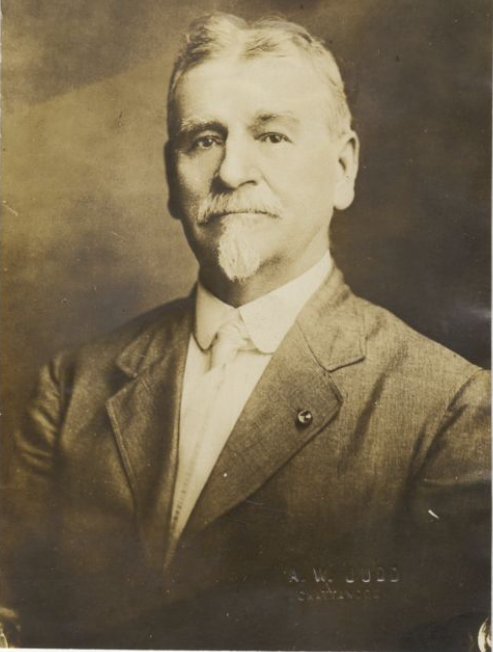
Chamberlain, c. 1910

In late 1863, Chamberlain cofounded the Knoxville Iron Company, with S. T. Atkins. On June 18, 1867, he and John T. Wilder founded the Roane Iron Company, in Chattanooga, Tennessee. Chamberlain then moved to Knoxville, Tennessee, and in 1868, partnered with pharmacist A. J. Albers and established the Albers Drug Company. On February 1, 1868, Chamberlain cofounded a second steel mill in Knoxville, alongside five Welsh ironworkers, using $150,000 of funds from local farmer J. S. Ross. The company gathered pig iron from East Tennessee steel mills, which it used to produce iron bars, nails, and railroad spikes.

Chamberlain left Knoxville in the same year, returning to Chattanooga and becoming vice president of the Roane Iron Company. In 1880, he became president of the company. In his career, he also founded the Citico Furnace Company in 1882. He headed the Chickamauga Trust Company and the First National Bank of Chattanooga, the latter for thirty years. He was also head the National Association of Manufacturers, a board member of the University of Tennessee at Chattanooga, and president of the Chattanooga School Board.

== Personal life and legacy ==
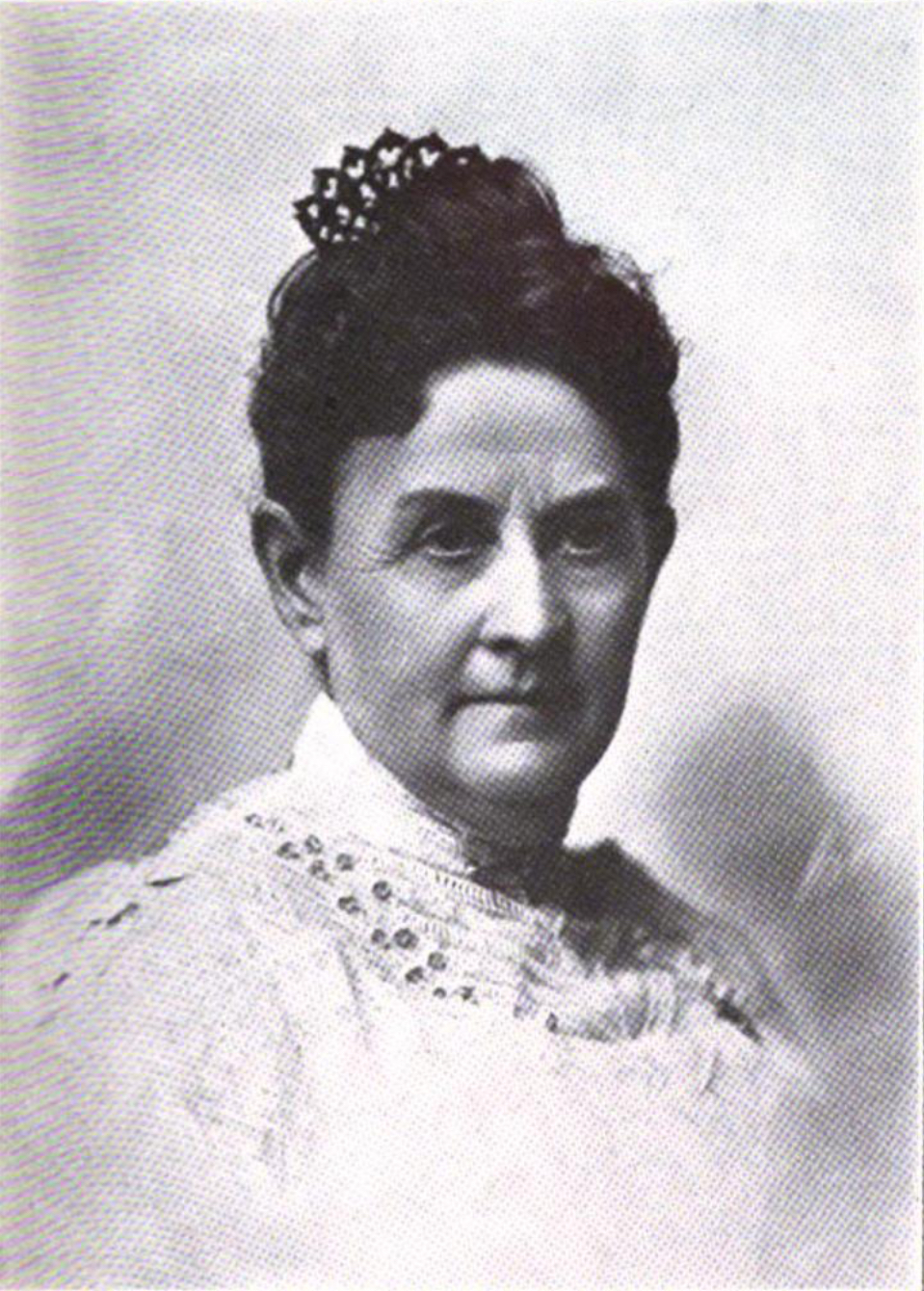
Amelia Isabella Chamberlain, Chamberlain's wife, in a 1923 publication

On September 4, 1867, Chamberlain married Amelia Isabella Morrow, having six children together: four daughters and two sons. He died on March 15, 1916, aged 80, in Chattanooga. His death was caused by an abrasion on his foot, sustained from exercise, which became infected and led to amputation.

Chamberlain Field, a stadium of the University of Tennessee at Chattanooga, was named for him and his son, Morrow. The stadium was dismantled in 2011, with its materials being used to construct the Chamberlain Pavilion.
