= Jackson Avenue Warehouse District =

Historic district in Tennessee, United States

- Jackson Avenue Warehouse District and Extension
- U.S. National Register of Historic Places
- U.S. Historic district
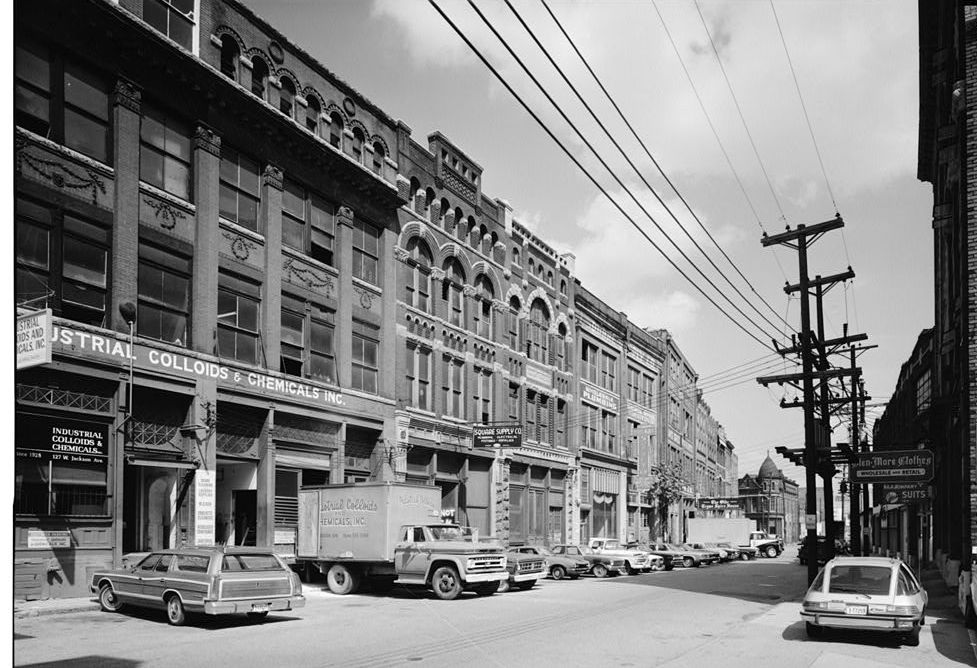
- Warehouses along West Jackson in 1976

- Location within Tennessee Location within the United States
- Location: Jackson Avenue; Knoxville, Tennessee
- Coordinates: 35°58′13″N 83°55′08″W
- Area: 11 acres (4.5 ha)
- Built: circa 1888–1910
- Architectural style: Romanesque Revival; Queen Anne
- NRHP reference No.: 73001802; 75002148
- Added to NRHP: April 11, 1973; March 10, 1975

The Jackson Avenue Warehouse District is an historic district in the Old City section of Knoxville, Tennessee, USA, listed on the National Register of Historic Places in the 1970s. The district includes several warehouses along the 100-block of West Jackson Avenue, as well as the Sullivan's Saloon building on East Jackson. The buildings were listed for their architecture and their role in Knoxville's late-19th and early-20th century wholesaling industry.

The district's original 1973 listing included the warehouses on the north side of West Jackson Avenue (i.e., 103, 121-123, 125-127, and 129-131) and Sullivan's Saloon (100 East Jackson). In 1975, the district was extended to include the John H. Daniel building (120-122 West Jackson) and the American Clothing Company building (124 West Jackson). During the 1980s, the north side of West Jackson Avenue's 100-block, along with Sullivan's Saloon and 120-122 West Jackson, were included in the Historic American Buildings Survey.

The Jackson Avenue Warehouses represent Knoxville's thriving turn-of-the-century wholesaling sector. Most of the buildings along the north side of West Jackson were built circa 1890—1910, with loading docks facing the tracks and elaborate Romanesque storefronts facing Jackson Avenue. Rural merchants would travel to Knoxville via railroad from across East Tennessee to purchase goods and supplies for general stores and other businesses. Sullivan's Saloon, built in 1888 by Irish-born innkeeper Patrick Sullivan (1840–1925), is one of the few remaining late-19th century saloon buildings in Knoxville.

In 1985, all of the buildings in the Jackson Avenue Warehouse District, along with the remaining historic buildings along West Jackson (all the way to Broadway), the Southern Terminal complex, the 100 blocks of East Jackson, North and South Central, and South Gay, the White Lily factory on Depot, and parts of State and Vine were listed on the Register as the Southern Terminal and Warehouse Historic District.
