= Knoxville riot of 1919 =

August 1919 mass racial violence, United States

- Part of Red Summer
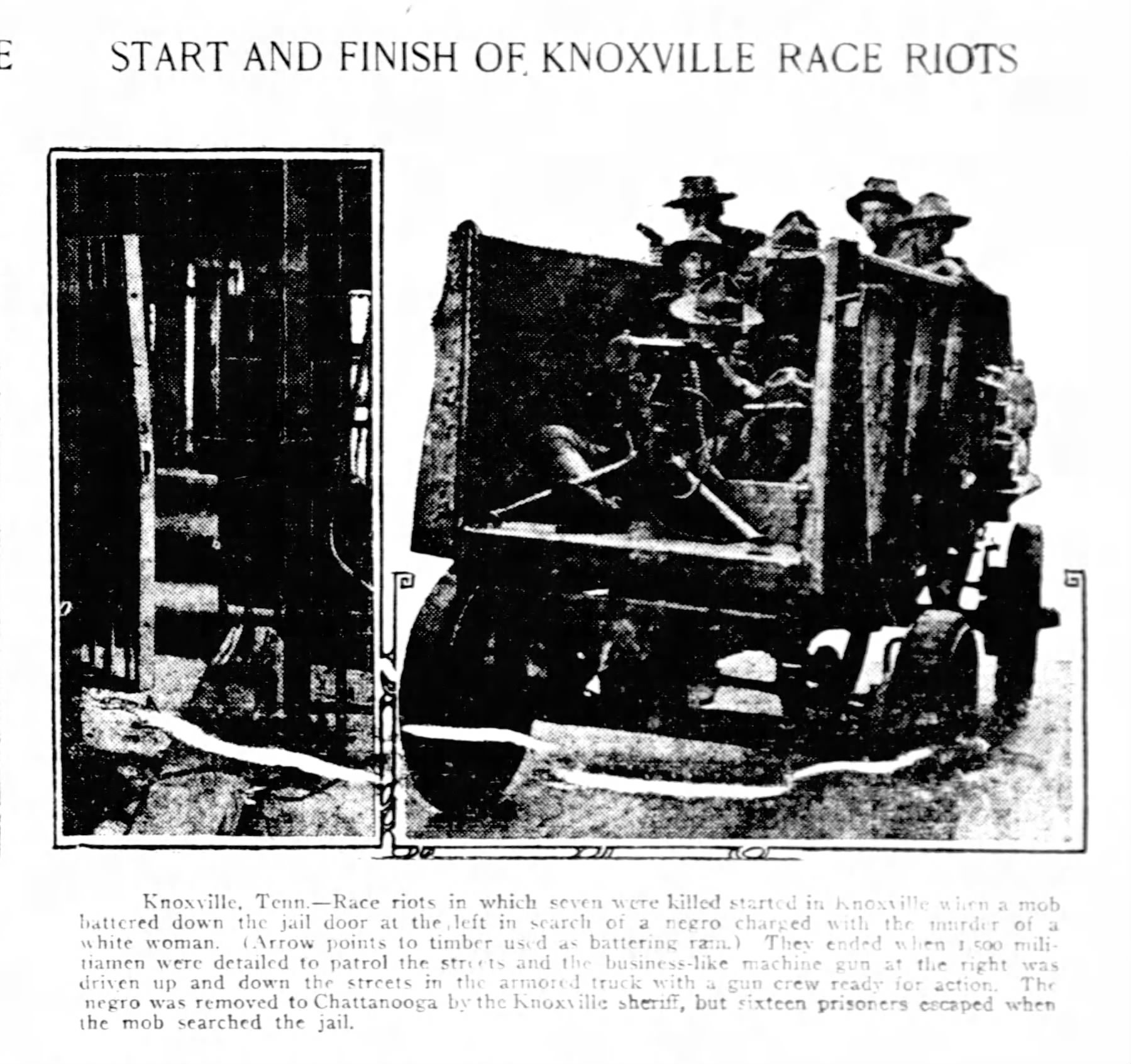
- "Start and Finish of Knoxville Race Riots" (The Washington Herald, September 8, 1919)
- Date: August 30–31, 1919
- Location: Knoxville, Tennessee, United States
- Deaths: ~7 (reported range from 2 to 30)
- Injuries: many injured

The Knoxville riot of 1919 was a race riot that took place in the American city of Knoxville, Tennessee, on August 30–31, 1919. The riot began when a lynch mob stormed the county jail in search of Maurice Mays, a biracial man who had been accused of murdering a white woman. Unable to find Mays, the rioters looted the jail and fought a pitched gun battle with the residents of a predominantly black neighborhood. The Tennessee National Guard, which at one point fired two machine guns indiscriminately into this neighborhood, eventually dispersed the rioters. Headlines in the immediate aftermath stated five people were killed, while the Washington Times reported "Scores dead." Other newspapers placed the death toll at just two, though eyewitness accounts suggest it was much higher.

The Riot of 1919 was one of several violent racial incidents that occurred during the so-called Red Summer when race riots plagued cities across the United States. The riot was one of the worst racial episodes in Knoxville's history and shattered the city's vision of itself as a racially tolerant Southern town. After the riot, many black residents left Knoxville, and racial violence continued to flare up sporadically in subsequent years.

== Background ==
=== Post-World War I racial tensions ===
In the decades following the Civil War, Knoxville was considered by both black and white residents to be one of the few racially tolerant cities in the South. It was one of the few where black citizens could vote, hold public office, and serve as police officers. In 1918, Charles W. Cansler (1871–1953), one of the city's leading African-American citizens, wrote to the governor of Tennessee, "In no place in the world can there be found better relations existing between the races than here in our own county of Knox. No race riots have ever disgraced our city and no mob has ever vented its fury here upon any Negro victim."

During the recession that followed World War I, however, migrants poured into Knoxville, overcrowding the city's slums. This increased competition for an already diminished number of jobs, and heightened tensions between black residents and working class whites. Both the Ku Klux Klan and the National Association for the Advancement of Colored People (NAACP) set up chapters in Knoxville in 1918. Furthermore, in the summer of 1919, a prowler known as "Pants," described by victims as a light-skinned Negro, had been burglarizing homes and attacking white women, though he had attracted little attention from Knoxville police.

=== Murder of Bertie Lindsey ===
Around 2:30 AM on August 30, 1919, an intruder broke into the home of Mrs. Bertie Lindsey on Eighth Street, where she had been staying with her cousin, Ora Smyth. The intruder shot and killed Lindsey, but Smyth managed to escape to the home of a neighbor who summoned police. Two patrolmen, Jim Smith and Andy White, arrived on the scene. Smyth described the intruder as a light-skinned Negro.

Patrolman White suggested they question Maurice Mays, a prominent mulatto who operated the Stroller's Cafe on East Jackson. While raised by foster parents, Mays is believed to have been the illegitimate son of Knoxville's mayor, John E. McMillan, and had actually been canvassing for McMillan on the day of the murder. Mays had a reputation for associating with both black and white women, making him unpopular with many of the city's white residents. Patrolman Smith later testified that Officer White specifically singled out Mays because of a personal grudge.

At around 3:30 AM, Knoxville police arrived at the Mays home on Humes Street. The only evidence they found was a .38 revolver, which the officers decided must have been fired recently (though Smith later testified the gun was cold and unlikely to have been fired recently). They arrested Mays and took him back to Eighth Street, where the distraught Ora Smyth identified him as the intruder.

== Riot ==
=== Storming of the jail ===
Sensing trouble, Knoxville police transferred Mays from the small city jail on Market Square to the larger Knox County Jail on Hill Avenue. Knox County's sheriff, W.T. Cate, then had Mays transferred to Chattanooga. By noon, news of the murder had spread, and a crowd of curious onlookers had gathered at the county jail, thinking Mays was being held there. A larger, angrier crowd had gathered on Market Square. By late afternoon, the crowd at Market Square had grown to about 5,000.

At 5:00 PM, the crowd at the jail became hostile, demanding Mays be brought out. Deputy sheriff Carroll Cate (the sheriff's nephew) and jailer Earl Hall assured them Mays was not there and allowed several members of the crowd to inspect the jail. Jim Claiborne, an intoxicated member of this crowd, walked to Market Square and told the crowd there that Mays was at the county jail, and that Cate and Hall were hiding him. Jim Dalton, a 72-year-old ironworker, called for Mays to be lynched, and the 5,000-strong mob roared towards the jail.

Unable to convince the mob that Mays was not in their custody, Cate and Hall locked the jail's riot doors. At about 8:30, the rioters dynamited their way into the jail, ransacking it floor by floor in search of Mays. They discovered and consumed a large portion of the jail's confiscated whiskey, and also stole as many firearms as they could find. They freed 16 white prisoners.

Two platoons of the Tennessee National Guard's 4th Infantry, led by Adjutant General Edward Sweeney, arrived, but they were unable to halt the chaos.

=== Gun battle at Central and Vine ===
After looting the jail and Sheriff Cate's house, the mob returned to Market Square, where they dispatched five truckloads of rioters to Chattanooga to find Mays. General Sweeney, awaiting the arrival of reinforcements, pleaded with the rioters to disperse. Meanwhile, many of the city's black residents, aware of the race riots that had occurred across the country that summer, had armed themselves, and had barricaded the intersection of Vine and Central to defend their businesses.

As the trucks began to depart, shots rang out on Central, and it was falsely reported that two soldiers had been killed. Sweeney immediately ordered his guardsmen toward Vine, and the mob followed. Along the way, rioters broke into stores on Gay Street to steal firearms and other weapons. As the guardsmen turned onto Vine, the street erupted in gunfire as black snipers exchanged fire with both the rioters and the soldiers. The National Guard set up two Browning machine guns on Vine, and opened fire toward Central. One guardsman, 24-year-old Lieutenant James William Payne, was shot and wounded by a sniper, and as he staggered into the street, he was cut to pieces by friendly fire from the machine guns.

Shooting continued sporadically for several hours. The black defenders charged the machine guns several times but failed to capture them. Among those killed was a black shopkeeper and a black Spanish–American War veteran named Joe Etter, who was shot when he attempted single-handedly to capture one of the machine guns. Outgunned, the black defenders gradually fled Central and dispersed, allowing the guardsmen to gain control of Vine and Central in the early morning hours of August 31.

=== The riot's end ===
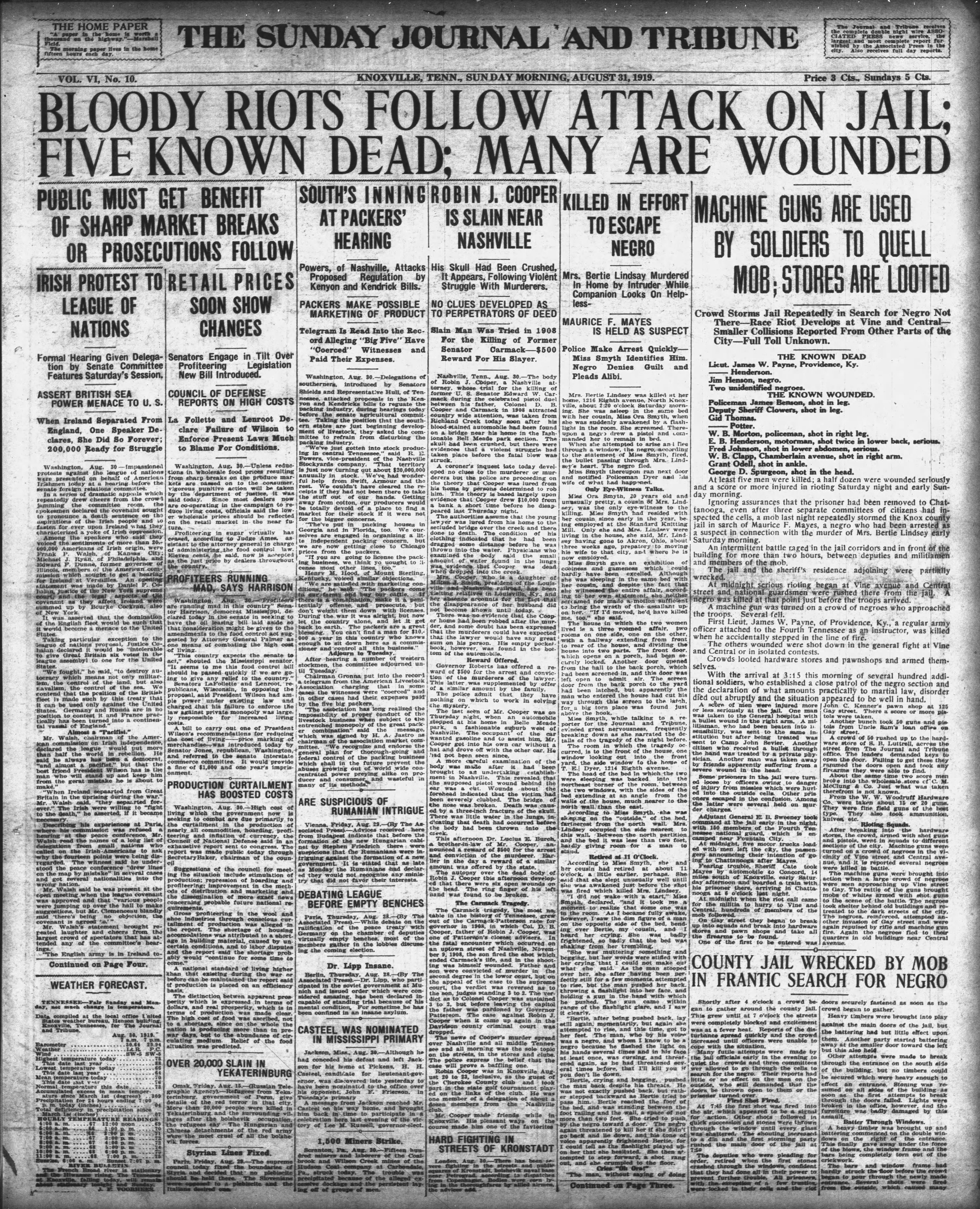
Knoxville Journal and Tribune, August 31, 1919

The National Guard immediately barricaded Central, and aggressively searched all-black residences inside the barricaded zone. A citywide curfew was imposed, and 200 white citizens were temporarily deputized. Scattered reports of violence persisted throughout the day. Two African American residents, Carter Watkins and Claude Chambers, were shot and killed at a train depot as they tried to flee. A deaf black woman was shot when she failed to heed a guardsman's orders to halt.

Some of Knoxville's newspapers placed the death toll at just one white person (Payne), albeit eyewitness accounts say it was much higher. Initial casualty reports listed Etter, Payne, a negro named Jim Henson, and two "unidentified negroes." A Chattanooga paper reported "Four negroes fell under the machine gun fire." Deputy Carroll Cate estimated that between 25 and 30 had been killed, while National Guard Major Maurice Martin placed it between 30 and 40. Others placed the death toll in the hundreds. By some accounts, the dead were so many that the bodies were dumped into the Tennessee River, while others were buried in mass graves outside the city.

A list of people hospitalized with wounds was published in the Chattanooga Daily Times on September 1:

- Fred Johnson shot through abdomen, may die
- E.V. Henderson, shot through lung, may die
- Grant Odell, Covington, Tenn., shot through ankle
- J.H. Lucas, gunshot wound
- Policeman W.P. Morton, shot through leg
- W.E. Clapp, shot through forearm
- Deputy Sheriff J. H. Clowers, shot through leg
- Gib Thomas, scalp wound and nose broken
- Carter Watkins, negro, may die
- Claude Chambers, negro dining car cook may die
- Charles Morton, negro, shot in mouth
- Sol Jackson, negro, gunshot wound
- George Haden, negro, hotel porter skull injured
- Ben Glover, negro shot in thigh by soldier while resisting search

A Covington, Tennessee newspaper stated that the dead were Payne, a private by the last name of Henderson, Jim Henson and two "unidentified negroes" and among the wounded were:

- Policeman James Benson
- Deputy Sheriff Clowers
- Policeman W.P. Morton
- Gid Thomas
- E.B. Henderson
- Fred Johnson
- W.B. Clapp

== Aftermath ==
=== The rioters and race relations ===
In the weeks following the riot, many of the city's African-American leaders argued that the rioters did not represent the typical attitude of Knoxville's white citizens, albeit hundreds of black residents left the city for good. Another riot nearly occurred in 1921, and flare-ups would take place sporadically for years afterward.

Knoxville's leaders refused to believe the Riot of 1919 was the result of racial tensions. The Knoxville Journal denied a race riot had occurred, insisting the entire incident was nothing more than the city's "rabble" running amok. Congressman John Chiles Houk argued that the lynch mob would have gone after a white murderer just as eagerly as they had gone after Mays. Fifty-five white rioters were charged with various minor offences in October 1919, but all were acquitted. According to Tennessee attorney general R.A. Mynatt in 1920, one person involved in the riots was sent to the penitentiary for one to five years, another was convicted but appealed to the Supreme Court, a third "leader of the mob is still sought." Per Mynatt, about 25 people were charged with misdemeanors for involvement in the riot, about 12 of 15 of whom were fined $100, "the remainder were set free after trial."

=== The Mays case ===
Accused killer Maurice Mays was treated more severely. Shortly after his arrest, Mays released a statement denying involvement, declaring that the case against him was one of "oppression and injustice":

Had the officers been honest in their duties, they would have arrested several suspects filling the description and kept the arrest secret, then they would have allowed the lady to come in a composed condition and pick out the guilty party. As it is, it looks like bad management based on oppression and prejudice. I believe the court will believe me...

In October 1919, Mays's trial began. Former mayor Samuel Heiskell served as a special prosecutor, while Mays was defended by defense attorney Reuben Cates and prominent black attorney William F. Yardley. Although there was no motive and virtually no evidence, Mays was convicted. The case was eventually overturned by the Tennessee Supreme Court, but Mays was convicted in a retrial in April 1921.

Shortly after 6:00 am on the morning of March 15, 1922, Maurice Mays was led from his cell and strapped to the electric chair at Tennessee State Prison in Nashville. At 6:12 a single jolt of 6,800 volts was sent through his body; he was pronounced dead four minutes later. Mays maintained his innocence of the charges against him to the end, ultimately ascribing his conviction and death sentence to "politics."

In 1926, former mayor John McMillan believed to have been Mays's biological father, committed suicide. On August 18, 1927, a white woman named Sadie Mendil made a signed confession to the murder of Bertie Lindsey. Mendil told the police that she had dressed in men's clothes and blackened her face on the night of the murder. She said she murdered Lindsey out of jealousy since she had seen her husband visit Lindsey's home several nights earlier, leading her to conclude that the two were having an affair. However, Knoxville police chief Ed M. Haynes discredited the confession, saying that there were serious discrepancies in Sadie's account of the murder. Sadie was released from custody. Four days later, a man who identified himself as Mack Mendil arrived at Haynes's office and said his wife Sadie had made a false confession to the Norton police since she had "become temporarily demented from brooding over her baby," a two-year-old son who was being cared for by another family. This explanation was accepted and the matter was closed.

Efforts have been made to clear the name of Mays, but on July 26, 2011, Gov. Bill Haslam said in part, "The Governor is not in a position to grant this request. Decisions such as this are not easy decisions, especially when they involve substituting one's judgment for that of a jury over approximately 90 years later."

== See also ==
- Battle of Depot Street
- Knoxville: Summer of 1915
- List of incidents of civil unrest in the United States
- "If We Must Die"

== Bibliography ==
Notes

References

- Booker, Robert J. (2001). The Heat of a Red Summer: Race Mixing, Race Rioting in 1919 Knoxville. Rutledge Books. ISBN 9781582441504. - Total pages: 105
- Booker, Robert (October 4, 2011). "Robert Booker: Effort to clear name falls on deaf ears". News Sentinel. Archived from the original on December 2, 2013.
- Great Falls Daily Tribune (August 31, 1919). "Four killed in race war riots". Great Falls Daily Tribune. Great Falls, Cascade, Montana: William Bole and Oliver S. Warden. ISSN 2378-833X. OCLC 11299783.
- Lakin, Matthew (2000). "'A Dark Night': The Knoxville Race Riot of 1919". Journal of East Tennessee History. 72 (3). East Tennessee Historical Society: 1–29. ISSN 1058-2126. OCLC 23044540.
- Neely, Jack (March 9, 2011). "The Quest for a Late Reprieve for Maurice Mays". Metro Pulse. Archived from the original on April 7, 2012.
- Washington Times (August 31, 1919). "Scores dead in Knoxville riots" (Daily Broadsheet). Washington Times. Washington D.C.: William Randolph Hearst. ISSN 1941-0697. OCLC 10630160.
- Williams, Lee E. (2008). Anatomy of Four Race Riots: Racial Conflict in Knoxville, Elaine (Arkansas), Tulsa, and Chicago, 1919-1921. University Press of Mississippi. ISBN 9781604731903. - Total pages: 128
