= Battle of Depot Street =

The Battle of Depot Street was a municipal dispute and riot that took place in Knoxville, Tennessee, United States, on March 1, 1897. The incident began with a disagreement between city officials and Knox County officials over whether or not the Citizens Railway Company, led by William Gibbs McAdoo, had the authority to build streetcar tracks along Depot Street, sparking a standoff between city police and county sheriff's deputies. During the conflict, both McAdoo and his opponent, C.C. Howell, along with the mayor, head of police, fire chief, and over 200 workers, were detained by one side or the other. In the subsequent mob violence, one person was murdered and numerous more were wounded.

The incident was the culmination of a two-year struggle between McAdoo and Howell for control of Knoxville's streetcar system. McAdoo had gained control of the bulk of the system in the early 1890s, and successfully converted the system to electric power. This conversion proved costly, however, and his company was forced into bankruptcy. A syndicate led by Howell purchased most of the company's assets, but McAdoo maintained control of several routes, and the two filed suits and countersuits as they attempted to outposition the other. After this incident, McAdoo left Knoxville, and Howell consolidated the city's streetcar lines.

== Background ==
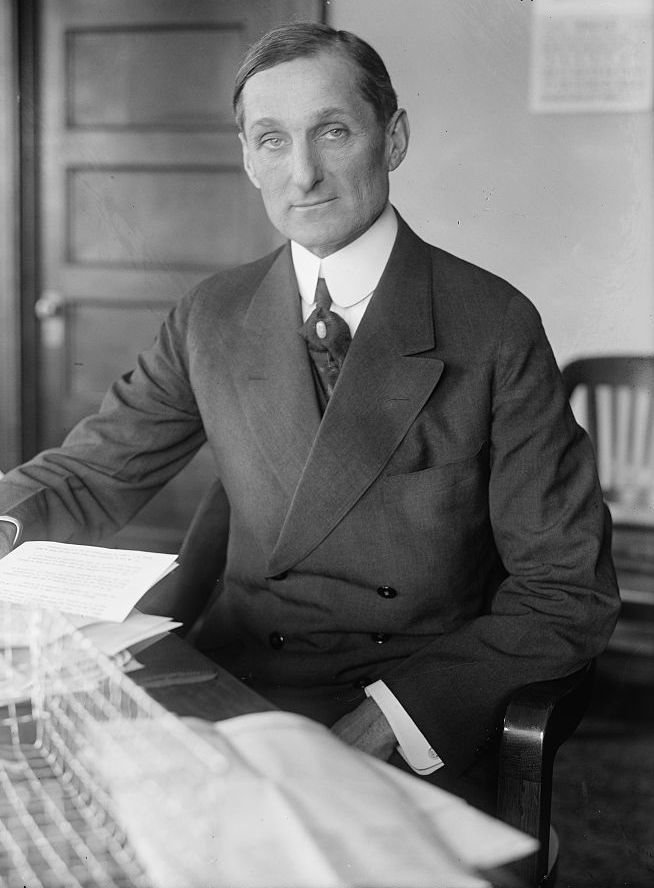
McAdoo

Knoxville's first streetcar company, the Knoxville Street Railway, was organized in the mid-1870s, and used streetcars pulled by mules or horses. In 1887, William Gibbs McAdoo (1862–1941), then a young attorney, organized the Elmwood Street Railway Company, which used streetcars that were steam-powered instead of horse-drawn. Three years later, McAdoo reorganized the company as the Rapid Transit Company, which became the first in the city to use electric-powered streetcars.

By the early 1890s, McAdoo, with the financial backing of a Philadelphia bank, had acquired the Knoxville Street Railway, which had grown to become the city's largest streetcar system, and merged it with Rapid Transit to form the Knoxville Electric Street Railway Company. While McAdoo successfully electrified this system, the cost of doing so was much greater than he had expected, and the company was unable to make its bond payments. It was forced into receivership in 1892 and disposed of in 1895.

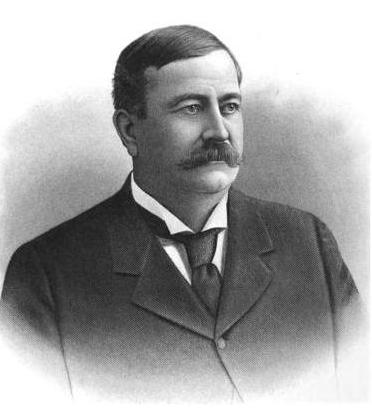
Howell

When Knoxville Electric Street Railway's assets were auctioned off, a group of investors represented by Ohio businessman C.C. Howell (1848–1902) won the largest portion of the company, while McAdoo won the much smaller Rapid Transit portion. McAdoo reorganized Rapid Transit as the Citizens Railway Company, and focused on the untapped market of North Knoxville (then a separate city). Howell, meanwhile, severed the connection between his system and Citizens Railway, effectively cutting the latter off from the downtown area. In September 1895, he attempted to build tracks over routes granted to Citizens Railway, but was stopped by the city after a long court battle.

Throughout 1896, McAdoo's company and Howell's company engaged in a series of maneuvers and countermaneuvers in hopes of thwarting one another's progress. When Citizens Railway attempted to build a line on Park Street in July 1896, Howell placed a streetcar in their path, and gave a security guard orders to shoot anyone who tried to move it. In October 1896, several Citizens employees were arrested when they attempted to install tracks on Depot Street to provide a vital link between the company's Broadway line and the Southern Terminal, and McAdoo sued the city.

In the early hours of March 1, 1897, McAdoo, having obtained an injunction from the Knox County Chancery Court prohibiting the city from obstructing Citizens Railway's work on Depot Street, hired 200 laborers to begin laying tracks. Lookouts posted by Howell tipped off the Knoxville police, who rushed to the scene and ordered a cessation of the work. McAdoo, confident in the injunction, ordered the workers to ignore the police and continue working. The police then arrested McAdoo and several workers, but being badly outnumbered with the situation intensifying, were unable to halt the work and sent for reinforcements.

By 8 o'clock, a mob of around 2,000 people had gathered to watch the events. The crowd sympathized with McAdoo and the workers, and whenever a worker was arrested, someone in the crowd would step in to take his place. Losing control of the situation, the police called in the fire department, which dispersed the workers with high-powered hoses. One of the drenched workers, William Arnold, attacked the fire chief with a pick, and was in turn shot and mortally wounded by a police officer.

Fearing a riot, Mayor Samuel G. Heiskell arrived on the scene, and pleaded for the crowd to disperse, but to no avail. With the crowd growing more defiant, McAdoo, who had been released, returned to the scene to a roaring applause, and delivered a rousing speech, blasting city authorities as "servants" of Howell, and vowing that his company would not be stopped. Sheriff's deputies finally arrived with a copy of the injunction, claimed the city had violated it, and arrested all city authorities at the scene, including Mayor Heiskell, the police chief, the fire chief, and several policemen and firemen. C.C. Howell and several of his subordinates were also arrested.

While these events were unfolding, Knoxville's city attorney had managed to secure an injunction ordering Citizens Railway to halt construction. Obeying this new order, sheriff's deputies quietly dispersed the workers. By noon, the crowd had mostly dissipated.

== Aftermath ==
Follow-up investigations by the city praised the police department's actions, and vindicated the officer who had killed William Arnold. Subsequent litigation favored Howell's company, and left Citizens Railway with little choice but sell out to Howell. Frustrated, McAdoo left Knoxville for good and returned to his law practice in New York. Howell rechartered his company as the Knoxville Traction Company, which by 1898 controlled all of Knoxville's streetcar lines.

Howell ran unsuccessfully for the Tennessee state senate in 1901, and died the following year. In the early 1900s, McAdoo helped expand the New York-area railway system, and later served as U.S. Secretary of the Treasury in the Woodrow Wilson administration. In 1905, Howell's company was absorbed into the Knoxville Railway and Light Company, which operated the city's streetcar lines for several decades.

== See also ==
- Knoxville Riot of 1919
