= Knoxville Iron Company =

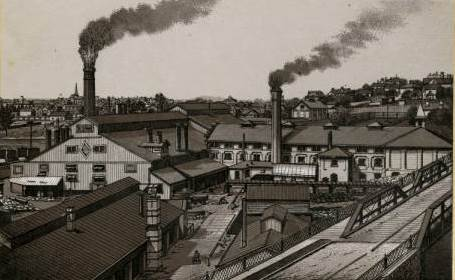
The Knoxville Iron Company complex in 1889

The Knoxville Iron Company was an iron production and coal mining company that operated primarily in Knoxville, Tennessee, United States, and its vicinity, in the late 19th and 20th centuries. The company was Knoxville's first major post-Civil War manufacturing firm, and played a key role in bringing heavy industry and railroad facilities to the city. The company was also the first to conduct major coal mining operations in the lucrative coalfields of western Anderson County, and helped establish one of Knoxville's first residential neighborhoods, Mechanicsville, in the late 1860s.

During the 1890s and early 1900s, the Knoxville Iron Company was involved in two key events in the history of Tennessee's labor movement. The first came in 1891, when the company's Anderson County coal mines were among the targets of striking miners during the Coal Creek War. The second came several years later, when the company challenged a state law requiring companies to pay employees in cash, leading to the Supreme Court ruling, Knoxville Iron Company v. Harbison (1901), which upheld the rights of states to ban scrip and other forms of non-cash payments.

The Knoxville Iron Company continued operating in some capacity or another until 1987. The company's mill is still used by Commercial Metals Company to recycle and manufacture steel rebar.

== History ==
=== Early history ===
During the Civil War, Confederate forces moved a small iron foundry from Loudon to Knoxville, but were unable to produce any iron, due in part to their lack of understanding of iron working processes. When Union forces occupied Knoxville in late 1863, Hiram Sanborn Chamberlain, a Union officer from Ohio, and S.T. Atkins, a local manufacturer, managed to get the foundry in working order. Chamberlain remained in Knoxville after the war, and he and Atkins continued operating the foundry.

Noting the largely untouched ore deposits in the hills around Knoxville, Chamberlain decided to develop a large-scale iron works in the city. He recruited Welsh-born ironmasters Joseph, David, and William Richards, who in turn brought in other Welsh immigrants skilled in iron production. Chamberlain managed to secure $150,000 in initial capital, much of it supplied by wealthy Anderson County farmer J. S. Ross. The Knoxville Iron Company was formally organized on February 1, 1868.

=== Expansion, 1870-1900 ===
To provide fuel for its foundry, Knoxville Iron began mining coal in the Coal Creek Valley of eastern Anderson County, shortly after the area acquired railroad access in 1866. The company expanded its Knoxville mill in the 1870s, most notably with the addition of a nail factory in 1875. By 1895, Knoxville Iron's mill was producing over 15,000 tons of iron per year, and employed over 200 workers. The company's products included bar iron, railroad spikes, channel iron, and track rails for use in mines. The company was also a major producer of coal, which it mined at its Coal Creek mines.

Along with Welsh immigrants, the company employed a large number of African American laborers. To house its workforce, the company expanded McGhee's Addition, a neighborhood just west of its mill. McGhee's Addition subsequently became known as "Mechanicsville," the word "mechanic" during this period referring to skilled factory workers. The company also opened a subsidiary, Harriman Rolling Mills, in Harriman, Tennessee, which by 1900 had become that city's largest employer.

=== Coal Creek War ===
Knoxville Iron initially used free labor at its Anderson County coal mine, but as production was continuously interrupted by strikes and other labor disputes, the company started using convict labor in 1878. In 1891, a labor uprising known as the Coal Creek War erupted in the Coal Creek Valley over the use of convict labor. While Knoxville Iron was not the initial target, the dispute eventually spread to its mine near the head of the valley. On July 20, 1891, and again on October 31, the mine's convict laborers were freed and several buildings destroyed. In spite of the dispute, Knoxville Iron continued using convict labor until Tennessee ended convict leasing in 1896.

=== Knoxville Iron Company v. Harbison ===
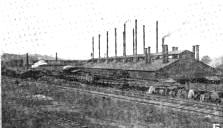
The Knoxville Iron Company plant, circa 1919

In 1899, Tennessee passed a law barring companies from paying employees in scrip. While Knoxville Iron paid its employees in cash, it allowed employees to accept payday advances in store or coal credits. Shortly after the law was passed, a securities dealer named Samuel Harbison purchased several hundred coal credits from Knoxville Iron employees for 85 cents on the dollar. When he attempted to redeem these for cash, the company refused to pay them. Harbison sued, arguing their refusal violated the state's anti-scrip law. After a Knox County chancery court ruled in favor of Harbison, Knoxville Iron filed an appeal challenging the state law, arguing the law violated the right to contract.

The Tennessee Supreme Court upheld the chancery court's ruling, and Knoxville Iron appealed to the U.S. Supreme Court. In 1901, the Supreme Court upheld (7-2) the lower courts' ruling. The majority opinion, authored by Justice George Shiras, acknowledged the abridgement of contract rights, but nevertheless agreed the law was a legitimate exercise of state policing powers to promote order. Edward Terry Sanford, a future Supreme Court justice, argued the case on behalf of Knoxville Iron.

=== 20th century ===
In 1903, Knoxville Iron constructed a newer, larger mill in Lonsdale, a millworkers' town on what was then Knoxville's periphery. Over the years, the company began focusing more and more on steel production. During the 1960s, the company refurbished its Lonsdale mill to produce rebar from recycled scrap steel. In 1987, the mill was purchased by the Florida Steel Corporation. Commercial Metals Company, the mill's current owner, still uses the mill to manufacture rebar. As of 2005, the mill employed 250 workers, and produced 509,000 tons of steel products annually.

== Legacy ==
- Knoxville Iron Foundry Complex-Nail Factory and Warehouse
- U.S. National Register of Historic Places
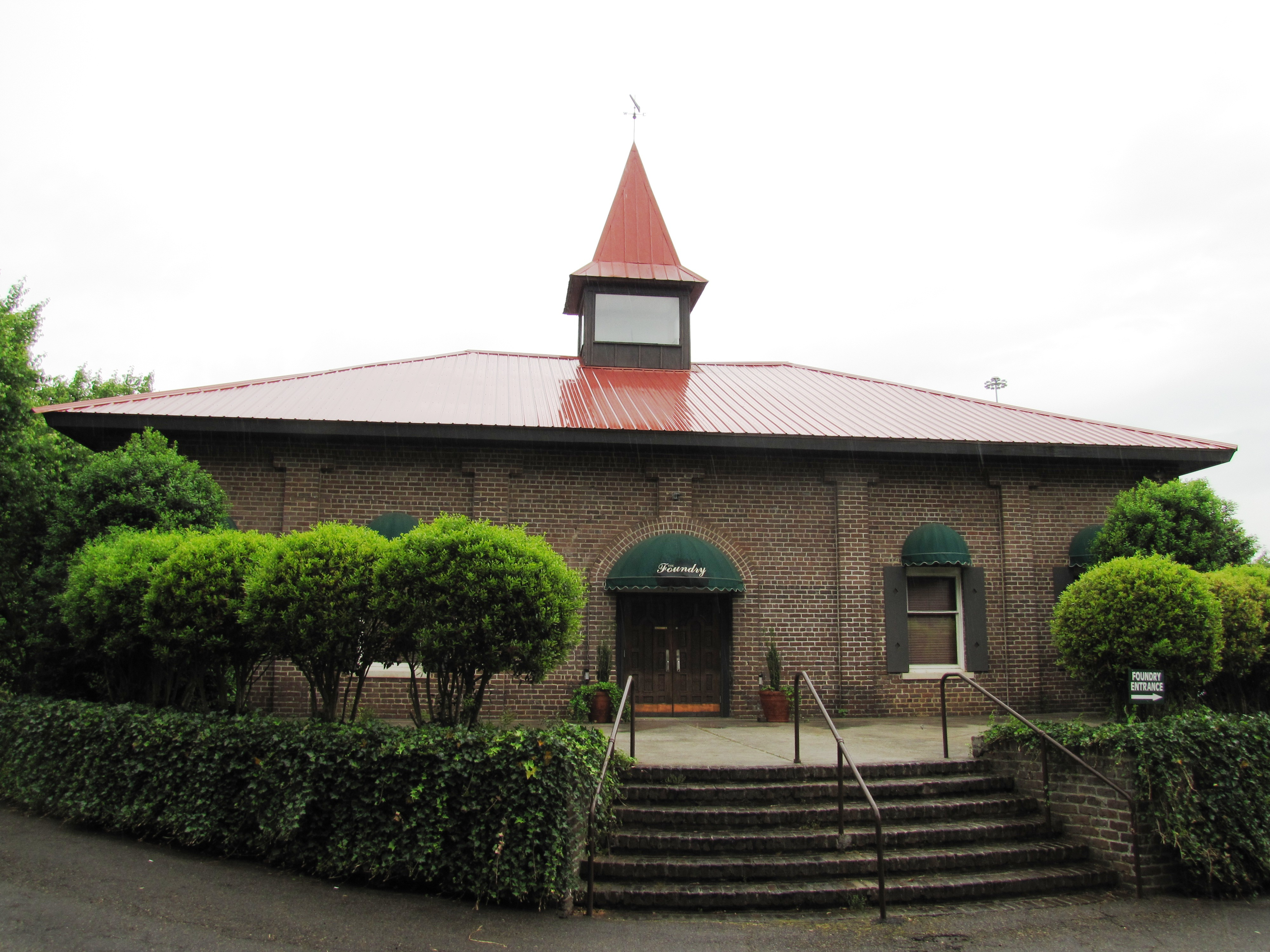
- "The Foundry," an event center (now the Knoxville Children's Theater) originally built as a nail factory by the Knoxville Iron Company in 1875

- Location within Tennessee
- Location: 1919 Tennessee Ave, Knoxville, Tennessee
- Coordinates: 35°57′55″N 83°55′36″W
- Area: 1.5 acres (0.61 ha)
- Built: 1875
- Architectural style: Late Victorian
- NRHP reference No.: 82003980
- Added to NRHP: March 25, 1982

The success of the Knoxville Iron Company helped attract heavy industry and railroad maintenance facilities to Knoxville. By 1886, several major manufacturing companies, including two large foundries, two textile mills, a rail car works, and rail car wheel company, were operating in the city. The iron industry declined in importance in Knoxville in the 1890s and 1900s, as steel and railroad companies demanded a higher-quality ore than the kind typically found in East Tennessee.

During the 1920s, Knoxville Iron general manager Willis P. Davis and his wife, Ann, first proposed the establishment of what would eventually become the Great Smoky Mountains National Park. In 1982, Knoxville Iron's 1870s-era nail factory, the last surviving building from its original Second Creek Valley complex, was renovated for use as an event center in the 1982 World's Fair. This building, now known as The Foundry, has since been listed on the National Register of Historic Places.

== See also ==
- Brookside Mills
