= Fourth and Gill, Knoxville =

Historic house in Tennessee, United States

- Fourth and Gill Historic District
- U.S. National Register of Historic Places
- U.S. Historic district
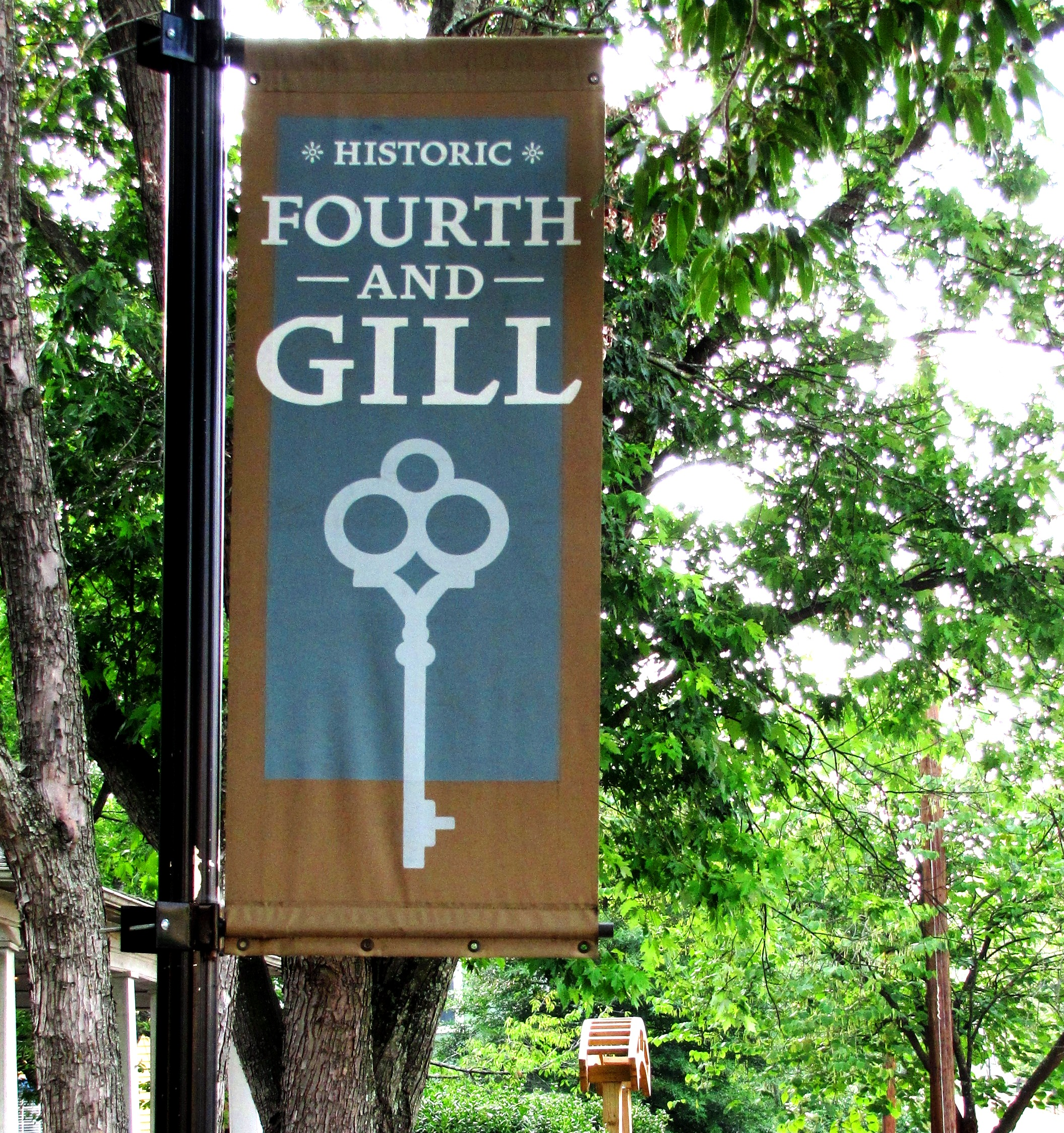

- Location within Tennessee Location within the United States
- Location: Roughly bounded by I-40, Broadway, Central, and Hall of Fame; Knoxville, Tennessee
- Coordinates: 35°58′48″N 83°55′14″W
- Area: approximately 72 acres (29 ha)
- Built: 1880–1930
- Architect: Baumann Brothers, George F. Barber; multiple
- Architectural style: Queen Anne, Bungalow/Craftsman, Mediterranean Revival, Gothic Revival
- NRHP reference No.: 85000948
- Added to NRHP: April 29, 1985

Fourth and Gill is a neighborhood in Knoxville, Tennessee, United States, located north of the city's downtown area. Initially developed in the late nineteenth century as a residential area for Knoxville's growing middle and professional classes, the neighborhood still contains most of its original Victorian-era houses, churches, and streetscapes. In 1985, 282 houses and other buildings in the neighborhood were added to the National Register of Historic Places as the Fourth and Gill Historic District.

Knoxville's rapid economic growth after the Civil War brought about a housing boom that lasted into the early twentieth century. The presence of the railroad drew heavy industry to the pasturelands north of the city, and residential areas such as Fourth and Gill were developed to provide housing for the managers and workers in the growing number of mills and factories. Much of Fourth and Gill was initially part of the separate city of North Knoxville, which was annexed by Knoxville in 1897. The neighborhood is named for a community center established at the corner of N. Fourth Avenue and Gill Avenue in 1960.

== Location ==
The Fourth and Gill neighborhood is roughly bounded by Hall of Fame Drive on the east, Broadway (part of U.S. Highway 441) on the west, Glenwood Avenue to the north, and East Fourth Avenue to the south. The Old North Knoxville community lies just to the north, Parkridge lies on the other side of Hall of Fame drive to the east, and the Emory Place Historic District (part of the city's Downtown-North Corridor) lies just to the south. The neighborhood's community center and oldest houses lie along North Fourth Avenue just east of I-40.

The Fourth and Gill neighborhood includes parts of Morgan Street, Gratz Street, Deery Street, Luttrell Street, and Eleanor Street, which run roughly north-to-south, as well as Wells Avenue, Caswell Avenue, Gill Avenue, Lovenia Avenue, and Third Avenue, which run east-to-west. North Fourth Avenue runs east-to-west across the area before veering north to join Gill Avenue as the latter passes under I-40, and then continuing north for several blocks on the east side of I-40.

== History ==
What is now Fourth and Gill remained pastureland throughout most of the nineteenth century. The construction of the East Tennessee and Georgia Railroad just north of Knoxville in 1855 made development in the area more feasible, and by the outbreak of the Civil War, what is now Emory Place had already been annexed by the city. After the war, factories were built along the railroad, and a market developed at Emory Place. This industrial growth brought about a demand for labor and a need for new housing, and around 1880, the first houses were built in what is now Fourth and Gill.

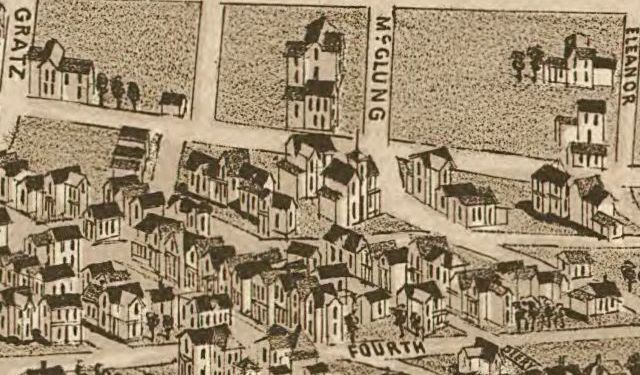
Detail of an 1886 map showing what is now the Fourth and Gill area

The housing boom north of Knoxville brought increased demand for city services, and as bureaucratic issues prevented quick annexation by Knoxville, part of Fourth and Gill—along with what is now Old North Knoxville—incorporated as the separate city of North Knoxville in 1889. L.A. Gratz, for whom Gratz Street is named, served as the city's first mayor, and the city's town hall was located at 977 Gratz Street. North Knoxville had its own school (located off Broadway near the North Central Street area known colloquially as "Happy Hollow" or "Happy Holler"), improved roads, and electric street lights.

During the 1880s and 1890s, several prominent figures built houses in the Fourth and Gill area. Tennessee governor Robert Love Taylor lived in what became known as the Caswell-Taylor House at 803 North Fourth (the house burned in 1985). Architect Albert B. Baumann, Sr., designed the Queen Anne-style cottage at 839 Deery Street for his younger siblings in 1892. Lovenia Avenue, which intersects Deery Street at the cottage, was named for Baumann's sister. During the following century, residents of Fourth and Gill would include furniture magnate James G. Sterchi, philosopher Albert Chavannes, White Stores founder Frank McDonald, Knoxville mayor Fred Allen, and Knoxville city manager Charles Karns.

The advent of the automobile in the 1930s led to a migration from urban areas to suburbs on the periphery of the city, and Fourth and Gill began to decline. Many of the neighborhood's houses were converted into low-rent apartments and duplexes by absentee landlords, and began to deteriorate. During the late 1970s, however, Fourth and Gill became one of the first neighborhoods in Knoxville to launch a successful urban renewal project, and many of its houses have since been restored.

== Fourth and Gill Historic District ==
The Fourth and Gill Historic District, added to the National Register in 1985, consists of over 250 houses, a school, and three churches, all built between 1880 and 1934. Unlike other Knoxville neighborhoods that developed during the same period, such as Fort Sanders or Mechanicsville, Fourth and Gill still contains most of its original houses, with few modern intrusions. Most of the houses built in the 1880s, 1890s, and 1900s have Queen Anne-style designs, while most of the later houses are Bungalow/Craftsman designs. Other architectural styles in Fourth and Gill include Gothic Revival, Mediterranean Revival, Tudor Revival, American Foursquare, Shingle, and Colonial Revival.

=== Notable buildings ===
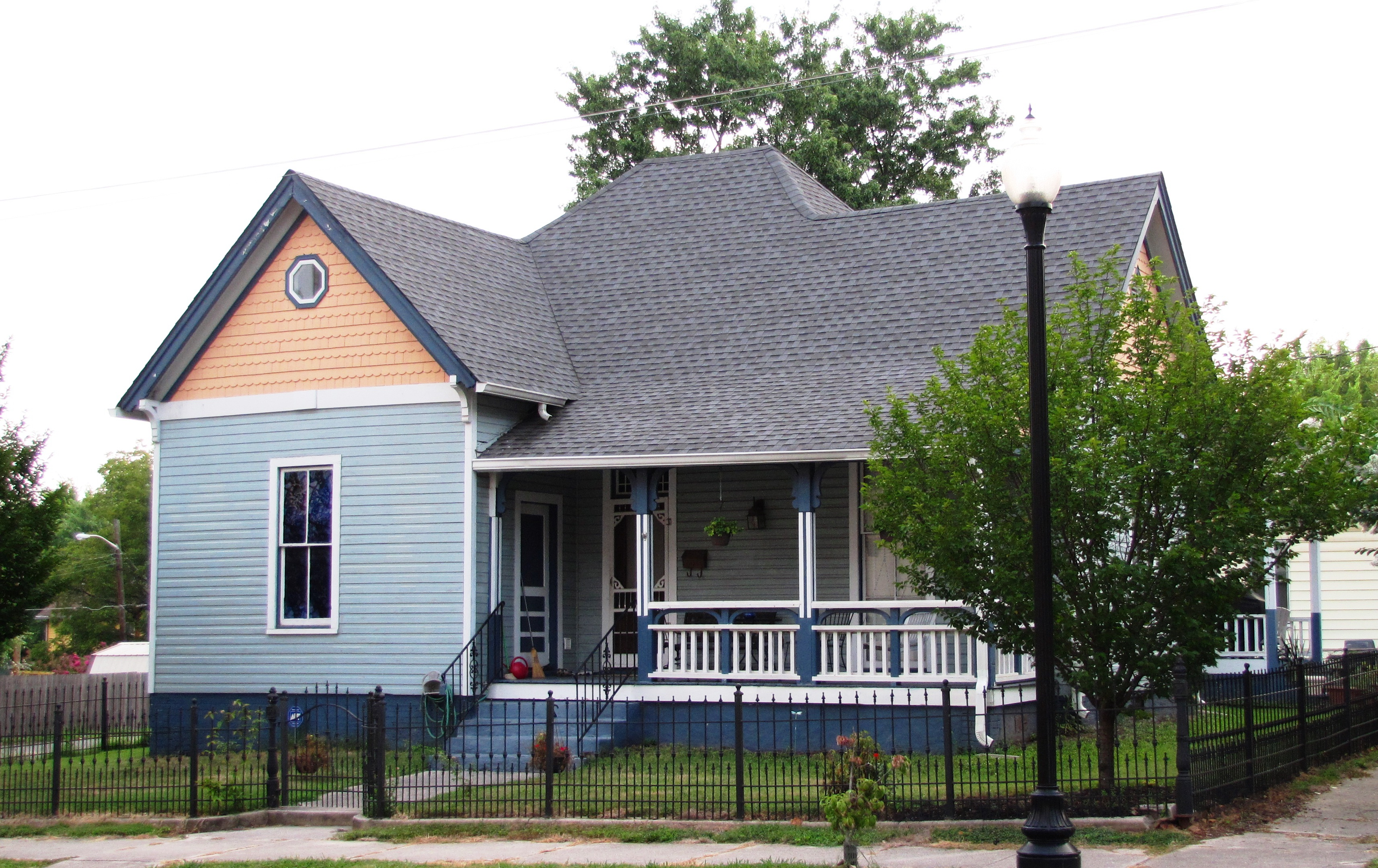
House at 839 Deery Street, designed by the Baumann brothers, Joseph and Albert

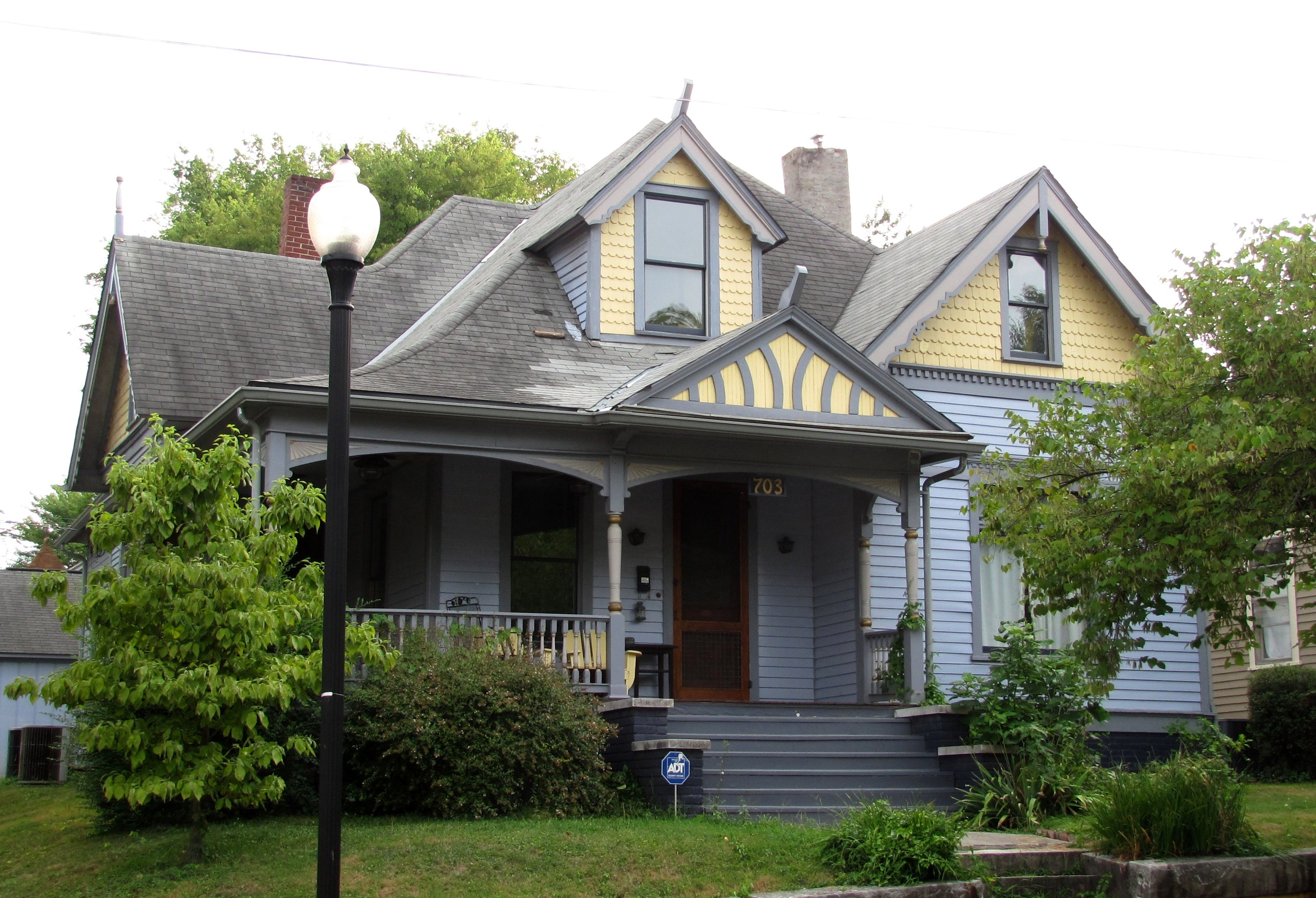
House at 703 Luttrell Street, designed by architect George Barber

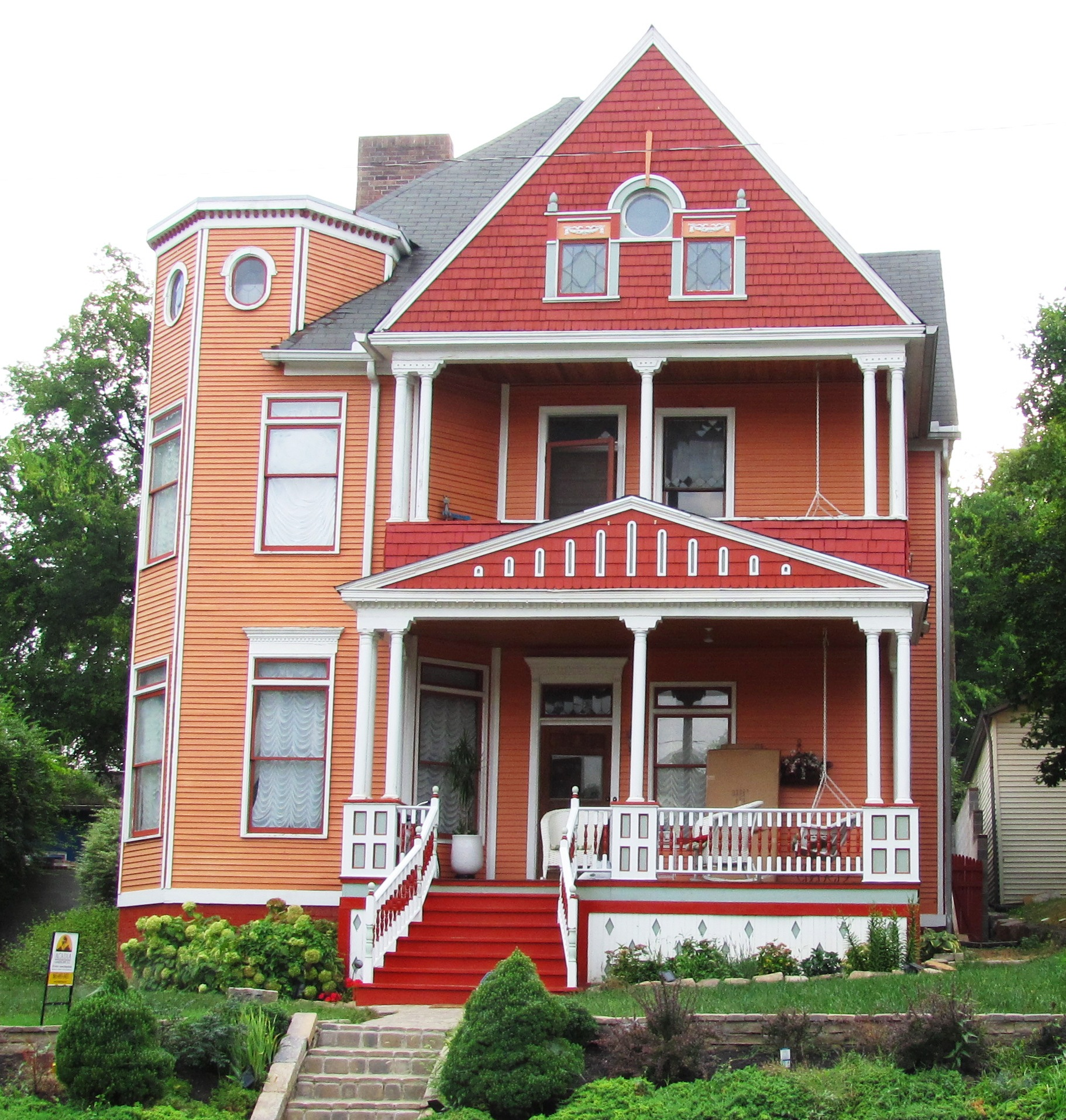
House at 933 Luttrell

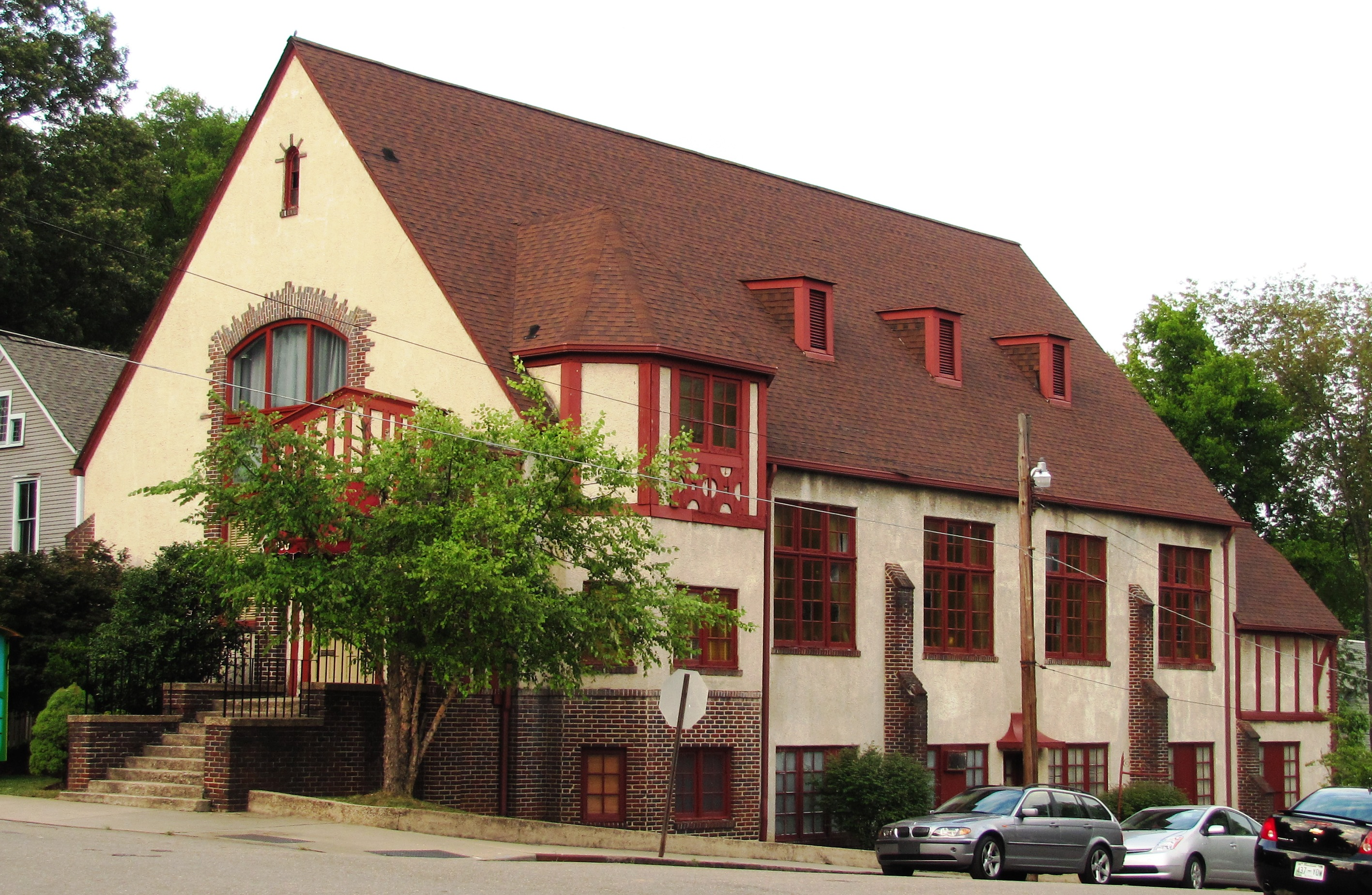
Tudor Revival-style church building at 800 Luttrell Street
- The Knoxville House of Faith (816 Lovenia), a two-story Gothic Revival-style church built in 1908. Originally the Trinity Methodist Episcopal Church, the church is now home to a Pentecostal congregation.
- Central United Methodist Church (201 Third Avenue), a two-story Gothic Revival-style church built in 1927, and designed by architects R. H. Hunt and Albert Baumann, Sr.
- 800 Luttrell Street, a two-story Tudor Revival-style church building constructed 1929.
- 800 Deery Street, a one-story Queen Anne-style cottage built c. 1890, and designed by architect George Barber.
- 821 Deery Street, a two-story Queen Anne-style house built c. 1890, and designed by architect George Barber.
- 839 Deery Street, a one-story Queen Anne-style cottage built c. 1890, and designed by Albert Baumann, Sr., of the architectural firm, Baumann Brothers.
- Eugene H. Wilson House (941 Eleanor), a two-story Colonial Revival-style house built c. 1905, and designed by architect George Barber.
- Thomas A. Kluttz House, a two-story Colonial Revival-style house built c. 1900, and designed by Barber & Kluttz
- Mrs. J. W. Taylor House (703 Luttrell), a one-story Queen Anne-style cottage built in 1902, and designed by architect George Barber.
- 907 Luttrell Street, a two-story Picturesque Vernacular-style house built c. 1895, and designed by architect George Barber.
- Cleveland Park (729 Morgan), a three-story Mediterranean Revival-style apartment house built c. 1925.
- 800 North Fourth Avenue, a two-story Picturesque Vernacular-style house built in 1891; now serves as the Fourth and Gill community center.
- 804 North Fourth Avenue, a two-story Queen Anne-style house built c. 1880.
- 808 North Fourth Avenue, a two-story Queen Anne-style house built c. 1885.
- 812 North Fourth Avenue, a two-story Picturesque Vernacular-style house built c. 1880.
- 816 North Fourth Avenue, a two-story Queen Anne-style house built c. 1890, and designed by architect George Barber.

The Caswell-Taylor House (803 North Fourth Ave.), the home of Governor Robert Love Taylor, was considered a contributing property in the Fourth and Gill Historic District, but is no longer standing. The two-story house was built in the Queen Anne style c. 1880.

== See also ==
- Cornstalk Heights
