= George Roby Dempster =

American businessman and politician

- Born: September 16, 1887; Knoxville, Tennessee, United States
- Died: September 18, 1964 (aged 77); Knoxville, Tennessee
- Resting place: Greenwood Cemetery; Knoxville, Tennessee
- Occupations: Businessman, inventor, politician
- Political party: Democratic
- Spouse: Mildred Frances Seymour
- Children: George S. Dempster; Josephine Dempster (Epperson); Ann Dempster (Smallman)
- Parent(s): John Dempster and Ann Doherty

George Roby Dempster (September 16, 1887 – September 18, 1964) was an American businessman, inventor, and politician, active primarily in Knoxville, Tennessee, during the first half of the 20th century. Dempster is best known for the invention of the Dempster-Dumpster, a commonly-used trash receptacle that can be mechanically emptied into garbage trucks, although by the end of his career he held over 75 patents. During the 1910s and 1920s, the Dempster Brothers Construction Company, operated by Dempster and his brothers, built a number of roads and railroads across the Southern Appalachian region. Dempster also served as a city manager and mayor of Knoxville, where he became known for his political battles with eccentric Knoxville businessman Cas Walker and Knoxville Journal editor Guy Smith Jr.

== Biography ==
=== Early life ===
Dempster was born in 1887, the ninth child of Scottish immigrant John Dempster and Irish immigrant Ann Doherty. John Dempster co-managed Scott, Dempster and Company, a gristmilling firm that operated a mill on First Creek. As a teenager, George Dempster travelled around the country working odd jobs for various companies, including the Chesapeake and Ohio Railway, the Atlanta, Birmingham and Atlantic Railroad, and the Ward Line shipping company. A railroad strike in 1903 left him briefly stranded in a hobo colony in Iowa. Dempster graduated from the Girls High School in Knoxville in 1906, having served as the school's class president.

After high school, Dempster worked as a steam shovel operator on the Panama Canal project, excavating the canal's Miraflores and Pedro Miguel locks. During the project, Dempster nearly lost his life on several occasions when rock slides caused his steam shovel to flip over. He also contracted typhoid fever, and bickered with famed physician William C. Gorgas over the most effective treatment. One of Dempster's earliest innovations was a device that allowed his shovel's dipper to mechanically empty its load.

=== Business career ===
After returning to Knoxville, Dempster, along with his brothers, Thomas and John, formed the Dempster Brothers Construction Company, which built roads, railroads, and small dams in Tennessee, North Carolina, Georgia, Virginia, and Kentucky. While initially lucrative, the company was forced into bankruptcy at the onset of the Great Depression. Dempster's Fountain City home (still standing at the corner of Broadway and Gibbs) was auctioned off to pay his debts.

In spite of these setbacks, Dempster and his brothers reorganized their remaining resources to form Dempster Brothers, Inc., which focused on heavy machinery. In 1935, the company introduced the "Dempster-Dumpster," the first large-scale waste container that could be mechanically emptied into a garbage truck. As orders for this product arrived from around the world, the company devoted all of its resources to the production of Dempster-Dumpsters. In 1939, the company introduced the Dempster-Balester, which crushed and baled automobiles. During World War II, the company produced pontoon boats and other equipment for the US Navy. The company introduced the Dempster Dumpmaster, the first front-loading garbage truck, in the 1950s.

The Dempster Brothers plant on Springdale Avenue in Knoxville consisted of eleven buildings on 27 acres (11 ha), and employed 450 workers, paying top wages with a benefits package unexcelled at the time. For humanitarian purposes, over 10% of the plant employees were physically disabled. The plant served as a training ground of sorts for welders and machinists who would later work on nearby Tennessee Valley Authority and Atomic Energy Commission projects.

=== Knoxville politics ===
Dempster, a lifelong Democrat, became actively involved in Knoxville politics during the 1920s. In 1929, he was named city manager, a position created earlier in the decade. After his appointment, he convinced the state legislature to merge the offices of city manager and mayor. This move proved unpopular, and Dempster was defeated by W. W. Mynatt in the mayoral election of 1937. Dempster continued to lead the opposition to Mynatt, forming an alliance with Knoxville businessman Cas Walker, who had a strong populist backing in the city.

During the 1930s, while city manager, Dempster began to clash with Guy Smith, Jr., editor of the Republican-leaning Knoxville Journal. Smith once stated that Dempster should be "relegated to the political ash heap and buried so deeply that one of his own Dumpsters can't dig him out." Dempster, likewise, quietly ordered the police to scour the city for Smith's car, and tow it away if it was illegally parked (which it often was). Smith ordered Journal photographers to crop Dempster from favorable group shots, and Dempster organized a raid that caught Journal owner Roy Lotspeich with a large supply of illegal whiskey.

Running on an anti-tax platform, Dempster's allies managed to recapture the mayor's office in 1945, and Dempster was again appointed city manager. Dempster broke his campaign pledge, and proposed new city property taxes. This provoked the ire of Walker, who immediately mounted a campaign against Dempster. Walker blasted Dempster's new taxes, and claimed that "gambling, whiskey and prostitution" flourished when Dempster was in power. After Walker was elected mayor in 1946, Dempster resigned as city manager. Walker's new city manager, Paul Morton, accused Dempster of cronyism, and undid most of Dempster's contracts and pay raises.

Walker's term as mayor proved tumultuous, and Dempster's allies managed to oust Walker in a recall election in 1947. Dempster was elected mayor in 1951. His tenure was largely stagnant, as two major textile mills closed, and the downtown area declined with the rise of suburban shopping centers. After he proposed a modest tax increase, Knoxvillians revolted, and voted him out of office in 1955.

=== State politics ===
Dempster served as the campaign manager for Henry Horton's gubernatorial campaign in 1928, and was subsequently appointed the state's commissioner of finance and taxation. In 1932, he was appointed to the Great Smoky Mountains National Park Commission, which was responsible for buying land for the national park. Dempster ran for governor in 1940, and lost in the primaries to Prentice Cooper.

=== Later life ===
Dempster was named a delegate to the 1956 Democratic National Convention in Chicago, although he largely retired from city politics after his defeat in 1955. He later rejoined his old nemesis Cas Walker in a successful attempt to thwart city-county consolidation, which was soundly rejected by Knoxville and Knox County voters in a 1959 referendum. Dempster died of a heart attack on September 18, 1964. Over 1,000 mourners, among them US senators Al Gore, Sr., and Herbert S. Walters, crowded into the St. James Episcopal Church for Dempster's funeral. He was buried next to his wife in Greenwood Cemetery.

== Legacy ==
Buildings constructed during Dempster's tenures as city manager and mayor include the Henley Street Bridge, the Church Avenue and Fifth Avenue viaducts, four public library branches, and Bill Meyer Stadium. He also convinced the city to buy Chilhowee Park and Tyson Park. Dempster built several houses in Knoxville, some of which still stand in Fountain City and Old North Knoxville.

Dempster hired the city's first African-American civil service secretary, and supported desegregation in the 1950s and 1960s. He championed a number of causes in support of the handicapped and the blind, including a radio program that featured blind pianists. He was given the Father Abram Ryan Award by the Knights of Columbus in recognition of his civil service shortly before his death.
