= American Temperance University =

- Harriman City Hall
- U.S. National Register of Historic Places
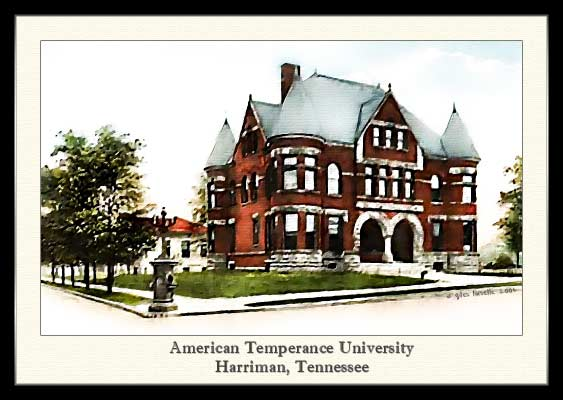
- Postcard depicting Temperance Hall

- Location within Tennessee Location within the United States
- Location: Roane and Walden Sts., Harriman, Tennessee
- Coordinates: 35°56′02″N 84°33′06″W
- Area: 1 acre (0.40 ha)
- Built: 1890
- Built by: East Tennessee Land Co.
- NRHP reference No.: 71000828
- Added to NRHP: April 16, 1971

American Temperance University opened in 1893 in the planned town of Harriman, Tennessee, which was developed as a community with no alcoholic beverages permitted. In its second year of operation the institution enrolled 345 students from 20 states. However, it closed in 1908. Those who attended included two students who later became members of the U.S. House of Representatives, John Jennings, Jr. and James Willis Taylor.

The university's main building, Temperance Hall, is listed on the National Register of Historic Places. It now houses Harriman city government offices. The university's Bushrod W. James Hall of Domestic Science for Young Ladies, named for benefactor Bushrod Washington James, is now an inn; it is included in the Cornstalk Heights Historic District.

== Sources ==
- Temperance in the Tennessee Encyclopedia of History and Culture
- Furnas, J. C. The Life and Times of the Late Demon Rum. New York: G. P. Putnam's Sons, 1965.
