= Trinity Methodist Episcopal Church (Knoxville, Tennessee) =

Historic church in Tennessee, United States

- U.S. National Register of Historic Places
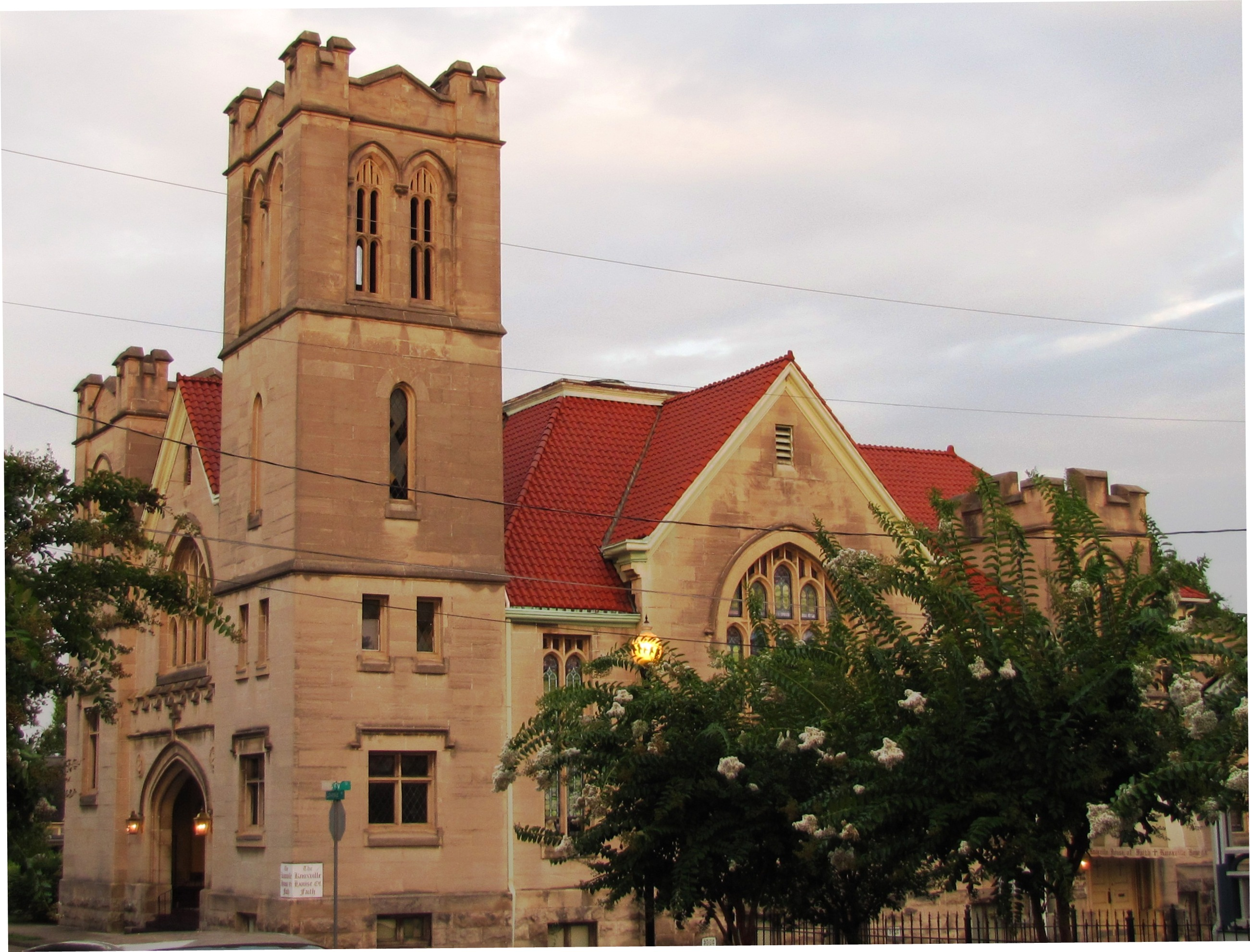

- Location within Tennessee Location within the United States
- Location: 416 Lovenia Avenue, Knoxville, Tennessee
- Coordinates: 35°58′41″N 83°55′18″W
- Area: less than one acre
- Built: 1906
- Architect: A. J. Cloud
- Architectural style: Late Gothic Revival
- NRHP reference No.: 82003984
- Added to NRHP: August 26, 1982

Trinity Methodist Episcopal Church (now known as Knoxville House of Faith) is a historic church at 416 Lovenia Avenue in Knoxville, Tennessee, in the Fourth and Gill historic district.

It was built in 1906 and added to the National Register of Historic Places in 1982. The sanctuary features high vaulted ceilings.

The building currently houses a small Pentecostal congregation.
