= Cornstalk Heights =

Historic house in Tennessee, United States

- Cornstalk Heights Historic District
- U.S. National Register of Historic Places
- U.S. Historic district
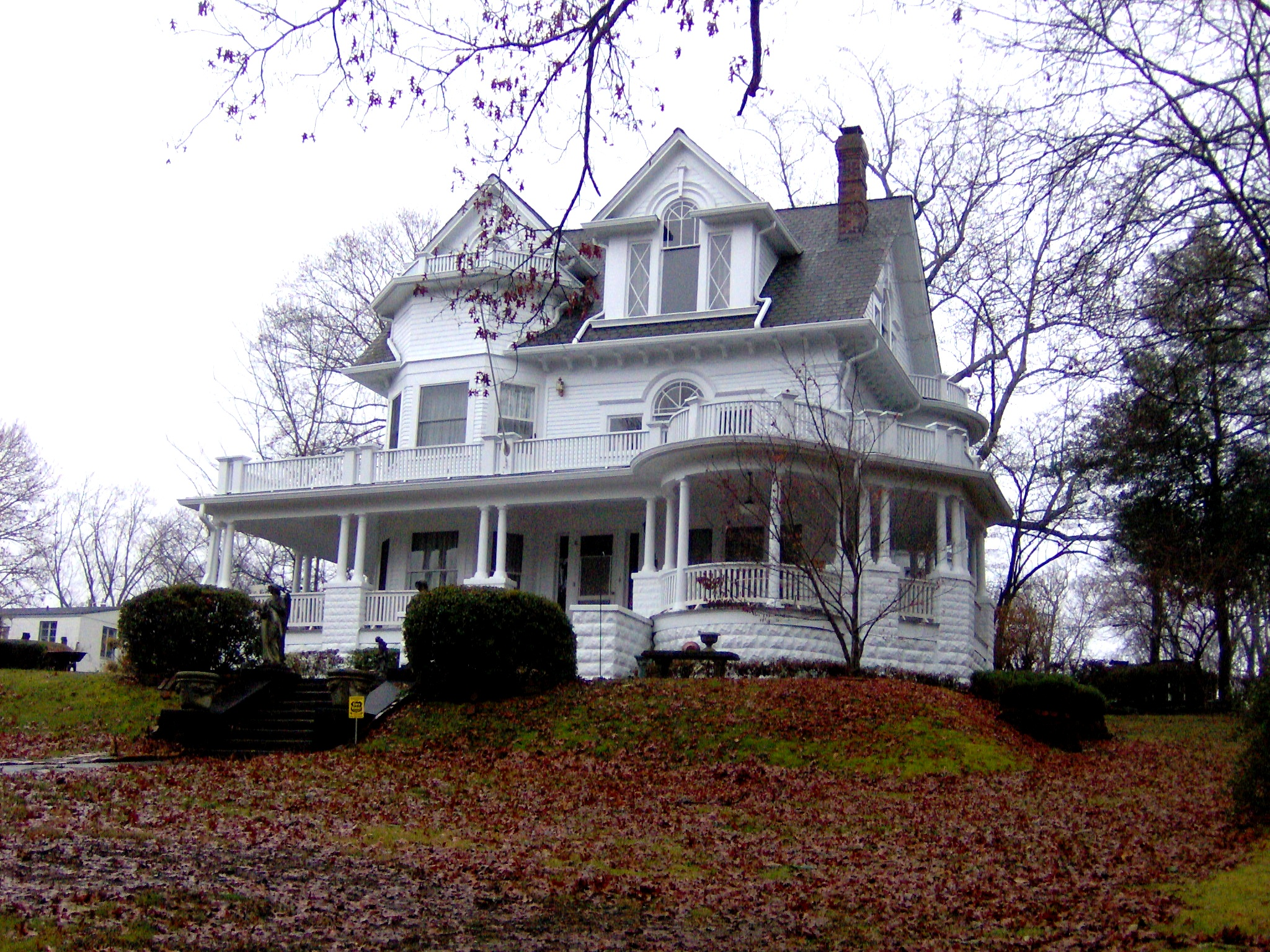
- Monte Vista, a Colonial Revival-style house in Cornstalk Heights, built in 1905

- Location within Tennessee Location within the United States
- Location: Roughly bounded by Georgia Ave., Sewanee St., Morgan Ave. and Trenton St., Harriman, Tennessee
- Coordinates: 35°56′3″N 84°32′48″W
- Area: appx. 66.43 acres (26.88 ha)
- Built: 1890–1940
- Architect: Will Geaseland, et al.
- Architectural style: Queen Anne, Colonial Revival, Bungalow
- NRHP reference No.: 90002142
- Added to NRHP: January 11, 1991

Cornstalk Heights is a neighborhood in Harriman, Tennessee, United States. Platted in the early 1890s as a residential area for Harriman's upper and professional classes, the neighborhood contains over 100 buildings added to the National Register of Historic Places in 1991 as a historic district for their architectural and historical significance. The neighborhood is named for the home of Harriman founder Frederick Gates, which once stood near the eastern end of the district.

Harriman was envisioned as a large-scale industrial center where the application of late 19th-century social reform principles, namely prohibition, would create an ideal living environment. The East Tennessee Land Company, led by Gates, designed the city in late 1889, including in the design several larger, more expensive lots in what is now Cornstalk Heights. Most of the district's earliest houses cost over $3,000 apiece, with some as high as $10,000—enormous sums for the period. Throughout the 1890s and early 1900s, Harriman's affluent residents built dozens of Victorian homes, most of which are still standing. In 1990, the Cornstalk Heights Historical Community Organization was formed to prevent the district's Killeffer Park from being converted into a housing development.

== Location ==
Cornstalk Heights is situated atop a low-rising ridge in the original section of Harriman, which is bordered by an oxbow bend in the Emory River on the north, east, and south, and by Walden Ridge on the west. The heights rise to a maximum of about 100 feet (30 m) above the rest of the city. The district is located along Cumberland, Clinton, and Trenton streets, which run north-to-south, and Walden, Crescent, Queen, and Virginia avenues, which run east-to-west. A narrow alleyway runs along the crest of the ridge between Clinton and Cumberland streets. The district consists of blocks 413–806 Clinton Street, 409–829 Cumberland Street, 502–702 Trenton Street, 418–503 Queen Avenue, 319 Virginia Avenue, and 330, 402–417, and 424–506 Walden Avenue.

The neighborhood contains 110 houses, 100 of which are contributing properties in the National Register listing. Killeffer Park, located along Cumberland Street, is also a contributing property. Two churches in the district—the First Presbyterian Church and the Open Bible Baptist Church—were built in 1956 and 1985, respectively, and are non-contributing buildings due to age. The district's lone contributing commercial building is located at the corner of Walden Avenue and Clinton Street.

== History ==
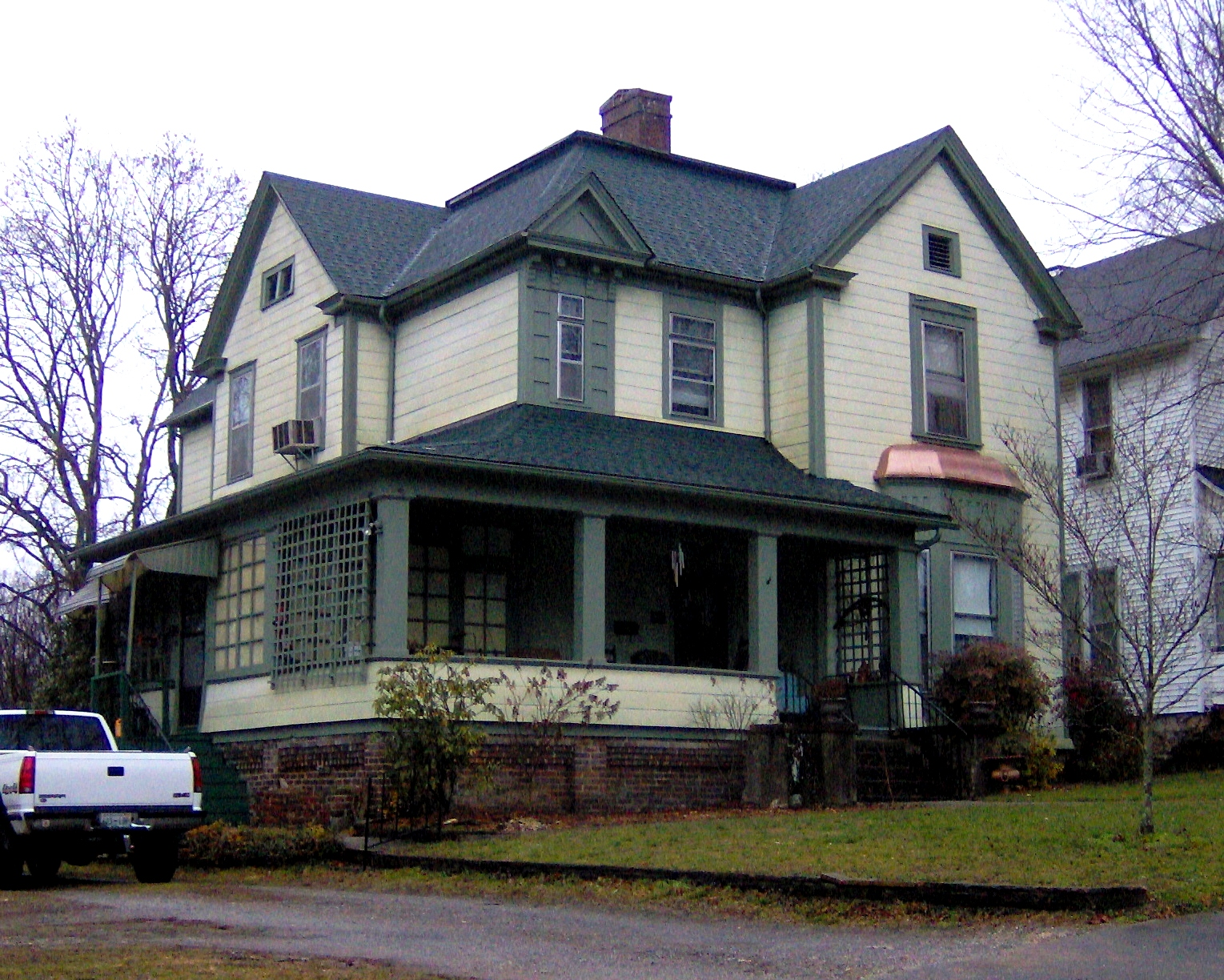
The Eastlake-style Russell-Jackson House (525 Cumberland St.), believed to be the oldest house in Cornstalk Heights

Before 1890, what is now Cornstalk Heights (and much of Harriman) was part of a large farm owned by Robert K. Byrd. That year, the East Tennessee Land Company, formed by northern Temperance activists led by Frederick Gates and General Clinton B. Fisk, purchased the land from Byrd's widow for $26,000. The company hoped to establish a large industrial center that would attract businesses, while at the same time demonstrate the benefits of barring the sale or consumption of alcoholic beverages.

On Christmas Day, 1889, the East Tennessee Land Company platted a 343-acre (139 ha) section of Harriman that included most of what is now Cornstalk Heights. These lots were sold in late February 1890 at an auction attended by over 4,000 prospective buyers from across the country. In the Cornstalk Heights section, lots along Cumberland Street and the section of Walden Avenue between Cumberland and Clinton streets typically sold for over $2,000. Lots along Clinton Street typically sold for over $1,000. The deeds to these lots required that lot owners construct frame or brick houses with at least six rooms. Over the next two years, fourteen contractors began building homes in Cornstalk Heights, using primarily materials from new industries that had been established across town along the Emory River. The homes of Gates and Gates' successor as the East Tennessee Land Company's general manager, William H. Russell (1857–1911), were probably the earliest homes built in Cornstalk Heights. Gates' house was demolished in the 1950s, but Russell's house still stands at 525 Cumberland Street.

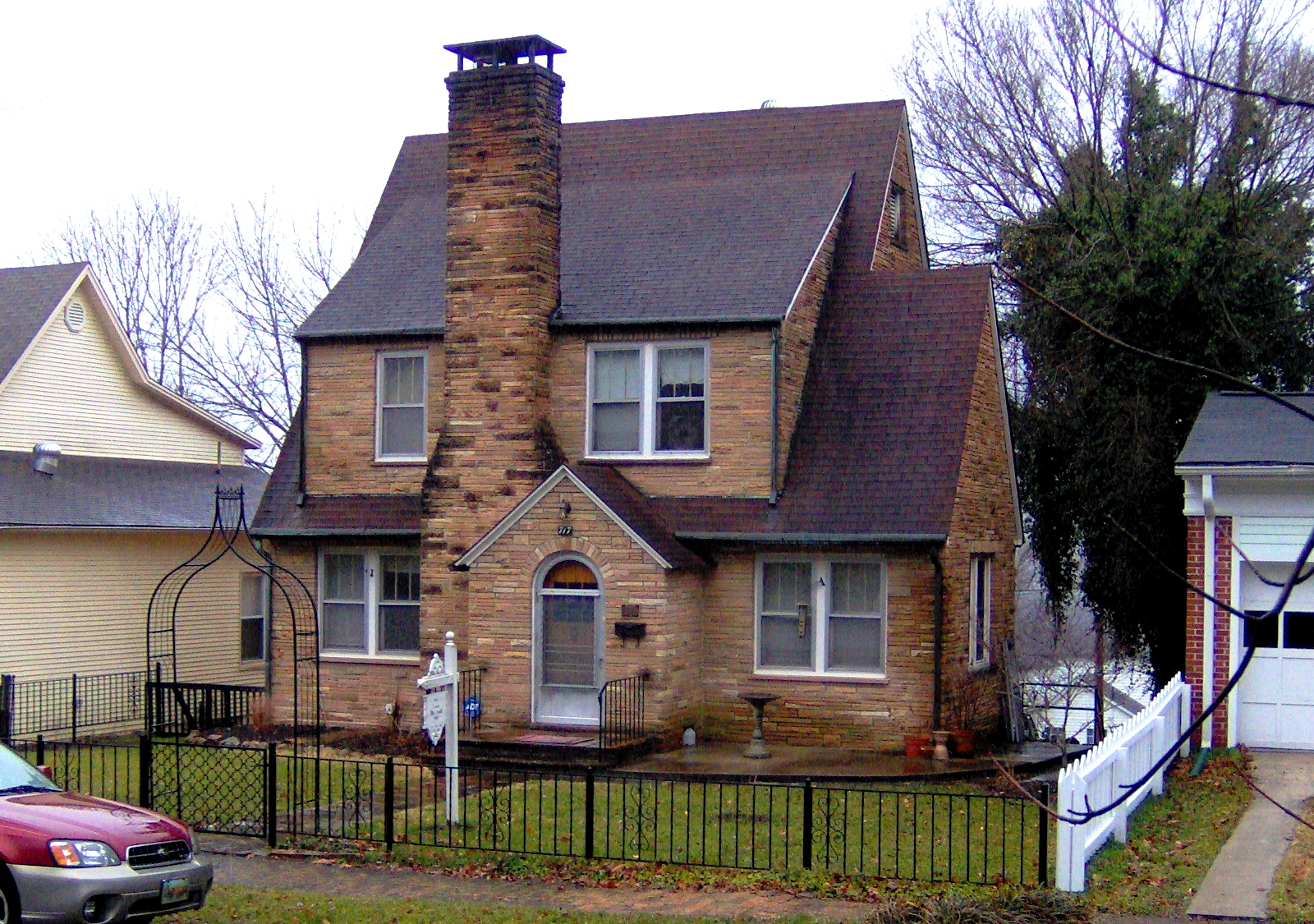
The Lewis-McCloud House, a Tudor Revival-style house built of native Crab Orchard stone in 1927

Although the East Tennessee Land Company went bankrupt in the wake of the Panic of 1893, it had succeeded in attracting enough new industry to help Harriman survive. Many of the heads of these new companies built homes in Cornstalk Heights. Henry Winslow, manager of the Harriman Land Company and Harriman's primary developer after the departure of the East Tennessee Land Company, built his house at 802 Clinton Street. David Gibson, owner of Gibson Agricultural Works, built at 403 Walden Avenue. V. G. Farnham, manager of the Harriman Tack Company, built at 813 Cumberland Street. S. K. Paige, owner of a lumber company, built the house now known as "Bushrod Hall" at 422 Cumberland Street. In the 1920s, Tom Tarwater—manager of the Roane Hosiery Company—built at 709 Cumberland Street.

The Reverend Alexander Killeffer, a photographer for the East Tennessee Land Company, founded Harriman's St. Andrews Episcopal Church in the early 1890s, and helped build its original meeting house at 630 Trenton Street, where the Open Bible Baptist Church now stands. The original design of Harriman included a park along Cumberland Street, originally named Fisk Park, but eventually renamed "Killeffer Park" after Killeffer's son, Louis, a long-time resident of Cornstalk Heights. The site along Clinton Street now occupied by the First Presbyterian Church was originally the site of a school, which operated from 1891 to 1917.

== Designs ==
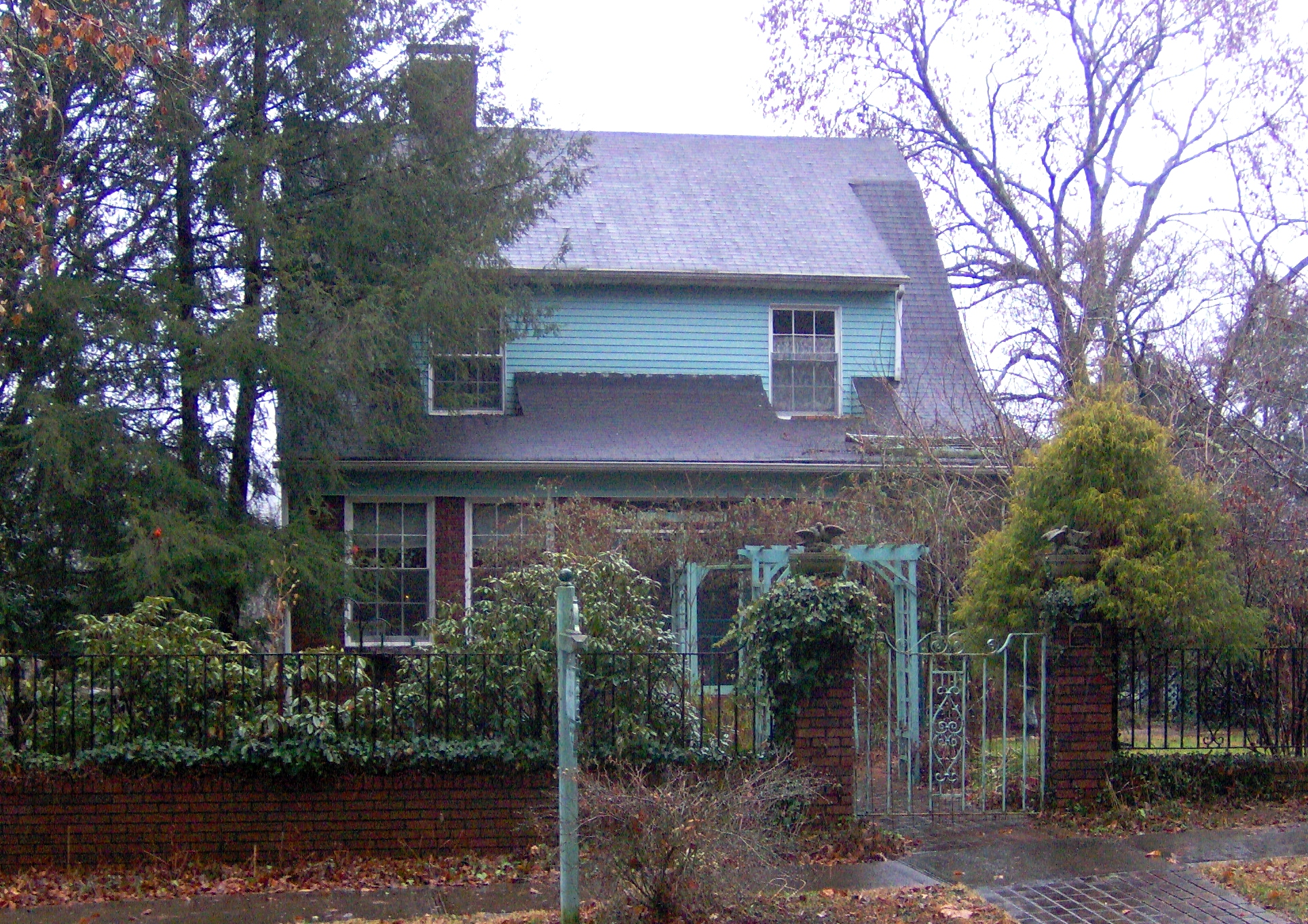
The Waterhouse-Nickle House, a Dutch Colonial Revival-style house built in 1924

The earliest (1890–1895) houses in Cornstalk Heights were mostly Victorian homes designed in Queen Anne, Eastlake, and Folk Victorian styles. Colonial Revival and Bungalow/Craftsman styles were more common for houses built after 1900. Other architectural styles represented in the district include Dutch Colonial Revival, Tudor Revival, Neoclassical Revival, American Foursquare, and Minimal Traditional.

Houses in the district range from one to three stories, and typically follow irregular floor plans. Most have gabled roofs, aluminum, brick, or stone siding, and limestone or brick foundations. The district has 33 contributing outbuildings, mainly carriage houses, servants' quarters, and garages. To compensate for abrupt changes in elevation, limestone retaining walls surround the perimeters of several housing lots, as well as Killeffer Park. The district's sidewalks still consist of the original bricks laid out in the 1890s, some of which bear the stamp of the Robbins Brick Company of Scott County, Tennessee.

=== Notable houses ===
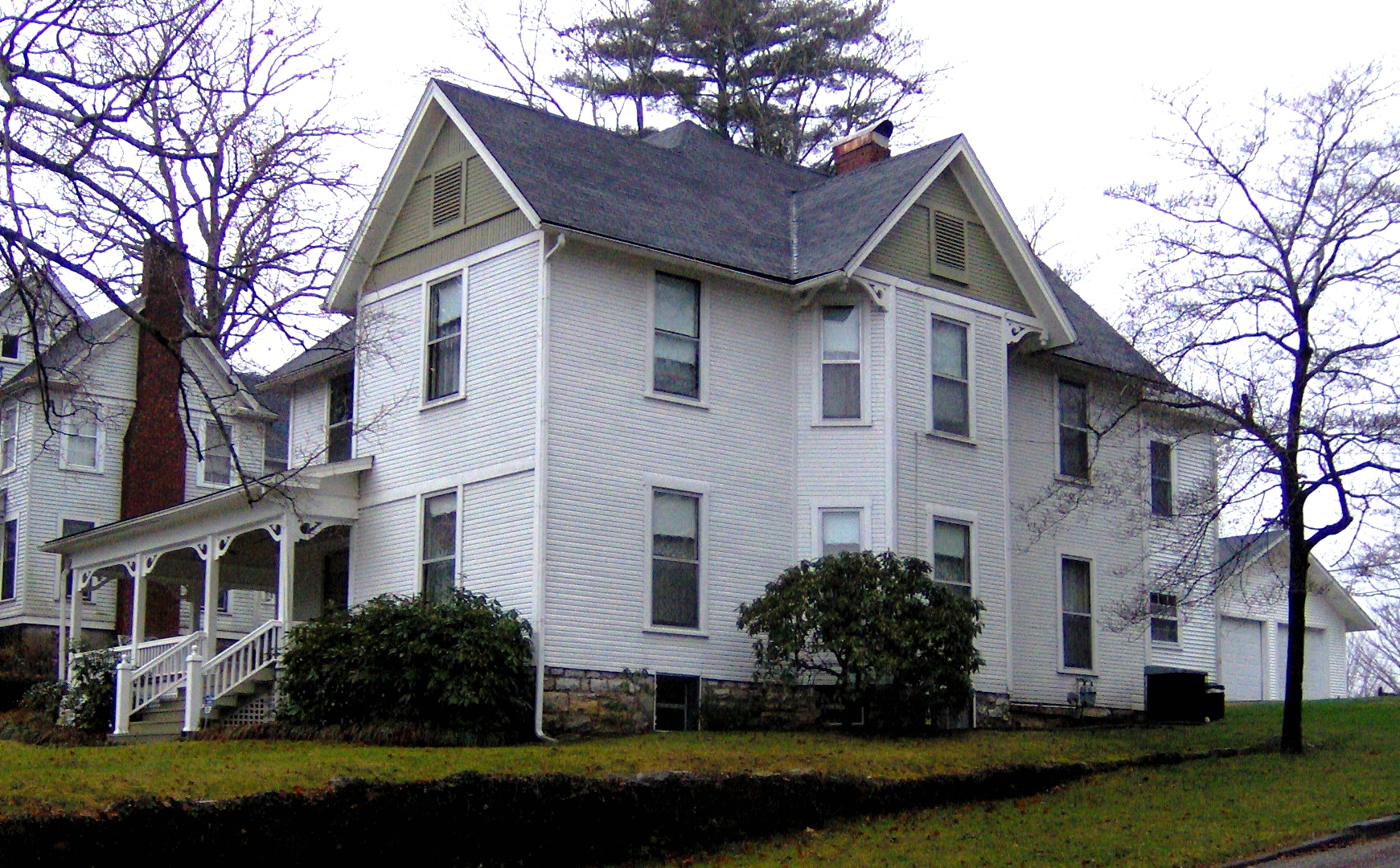
The Williamson-Jones House, or Lane House, a Folk Victorian house built in 1893

- Russell-Jackson House (525 Cumberland Street), an Eastlake-style house built in 1890 for William H. Russell, general manager of the East Tennessee Land Company, and believed to be the oldest standing house in Cornstalk Heights.
- Nottingham-Webb House (417 Clinton Street), also called the D'Armond House, a Queen Anne-style house built in 1890 by early Harriman judge C. W. Nottingham.
- Hopkins-Sutton-Coleman House (725 Cumberland Street), called "Colton House" a Folk Victorian house built 1890 and once used as a Presbyterian manse.
- Bushrod Hall (422 Cumberland Street), also called the Paige-Robinson House, a Queen Anne-style house built in 1892 by lumber mill owner S. K. Paige. In 1895, the American Temperance University purchased the house for its School of Domestic Sciences for Young Ladies, which operated until 1900. The house was renamed "Bushrod Hall" after one of the school's benefactors.
- Williamson-Jones House (629 Cumberland Street), or Lane House, a Folk Victorian house built by A. T. Waters in 1893. The Williamson and Jones families were later owners. The Lane family lived in the house between 1914 and 1965.
- Winslow House (802 Clinton Street), a Queen Anne-style house built in 1895 by Harriman Land Company manager Henry Winslow. Winslow's son, John Cooper Winslow, lived in the house until the 1970s, but stayed in just one room, leaving the remainder of the house as it was the day his mother died. John Cooper Winslow's odd behavior led to the development of a number of ghost stories surrounding the Winslow House.
- Monte Vista (514 Cumberland Street), or the Cassell-Conley House, a Colonial Revival-style house built in 1905 by Judge Robert Cassell and his wife, Perle.
- Killeffer House (506 Clinton Street), a Colonial Revival-style house built in 1939 to replace a 1904 house which had burned. Dr. Louis Killeffer, a physician whose parents were among the city's earliest residents, lived here until the 1970s.
- Hendrick- Branham Home (710 Clinton St.), a Two Story Bungalow style home. Built in 1896 by turn of the century mayor Claude E. Hendrick. His administration continued until 1915 and has become known to be longest term any mayor has served in Harriman, TN. This home is situated on 2 lots and features a full wrap around porch, stained glass windows, a two tiered 10 foot fireplace, and lead glass transom and sidelights windows. The largest room is the living room which is 36 ft. long. Upstairs in the bathroom you will find a 6 ft Clawfoot tub that is original to the home.

== See also ==
- Fourth and Gill
- Old North Knoxville
