= Cas Walker =

American politician and media personality (1902–1998)

Orton Caswell Walker

Mayor of Knoxville
- In office 1946–1946
- Preceded by: E. E. Patton
- Succeeded by: Edward Chavannes
- In office 1959–1959
- Preceded by: Jack W. Dance
- Succeeded by: John J. Duncan

Knoxville City Council
- In office 1941–1971

Personal details
- Born: Orton Caswell Walker; March 23, 1902 Sevier County, Tennessee
- Died: September 25, 1998 (aged 96) Knoxville, Tennessee
- Resting place: Woodlawn Cemetery
- Nickname: Cas Walker

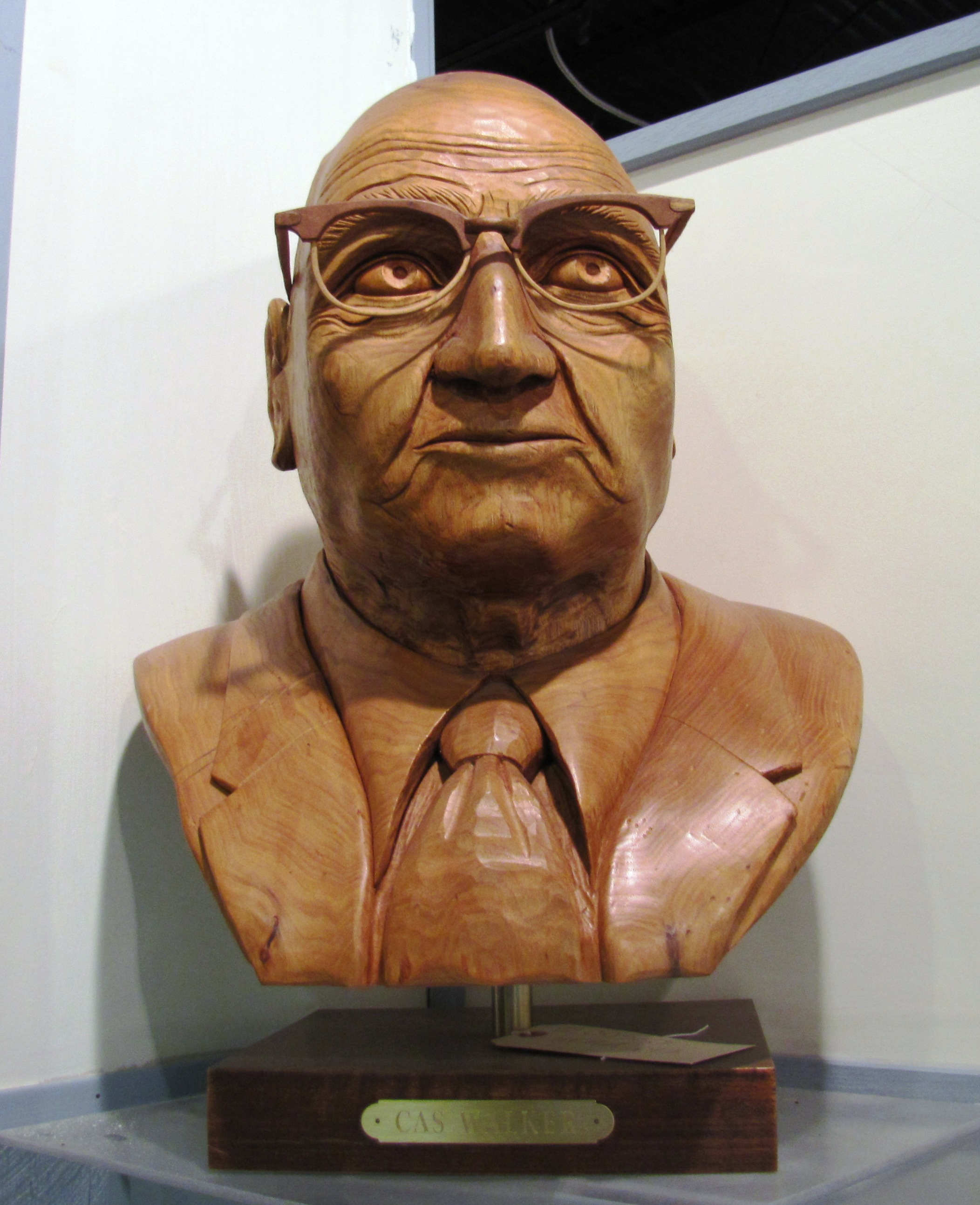
Bust of Walker

Orton Caswell "Cas" Walker (March 23, 1902 – September 25, 1998), was a Tennessee businessman, politician, and personality on television and radio. Walker founded a successful chain of small grocery stores that grew to include several dozen stores scattered throughout the Knoxville, Tennessee vicinity as well as parts of Virginia and Kentucky. From 1941 through 1971, Walker served on the Knoxville city council where he became legendary for his uncompromising political stances and his vehement opposition to what he claimed was a corrupt elitism in the city's government. The Cas Walker Farm and Home Hour, a local variety show sponsored by Walker, ran in various radio and television formats between 1929 and 1983 and helped launch the careers of entertainer Dolly Parton and the Everly Brothers.

== Early life ==
Walker was the seventh of twelve children born to a working-class family in Sevier County, Tennessee in 1902. He quit school at the age of 14 and spent several years working at different jobs around the region, namely at the Champion Fibre Company in North Carolina and later at various coal mines in Kentucky. In 1924, he returned to East Tennessee where he established the first Cas Walker's Cash Store in Knoxville with money he had saved.

Walker's stores had a simple rural atmosphere that was popular with the city's working class whites and blacks. He used his radio show and other innovative methods— such as scattering coupons from airplanes— to advertise his store's weekly specials. By the mid-1950s, Walker's chain had grown to include 27 stores that generated a gross annual revenue of $60 million.

== Politics ==
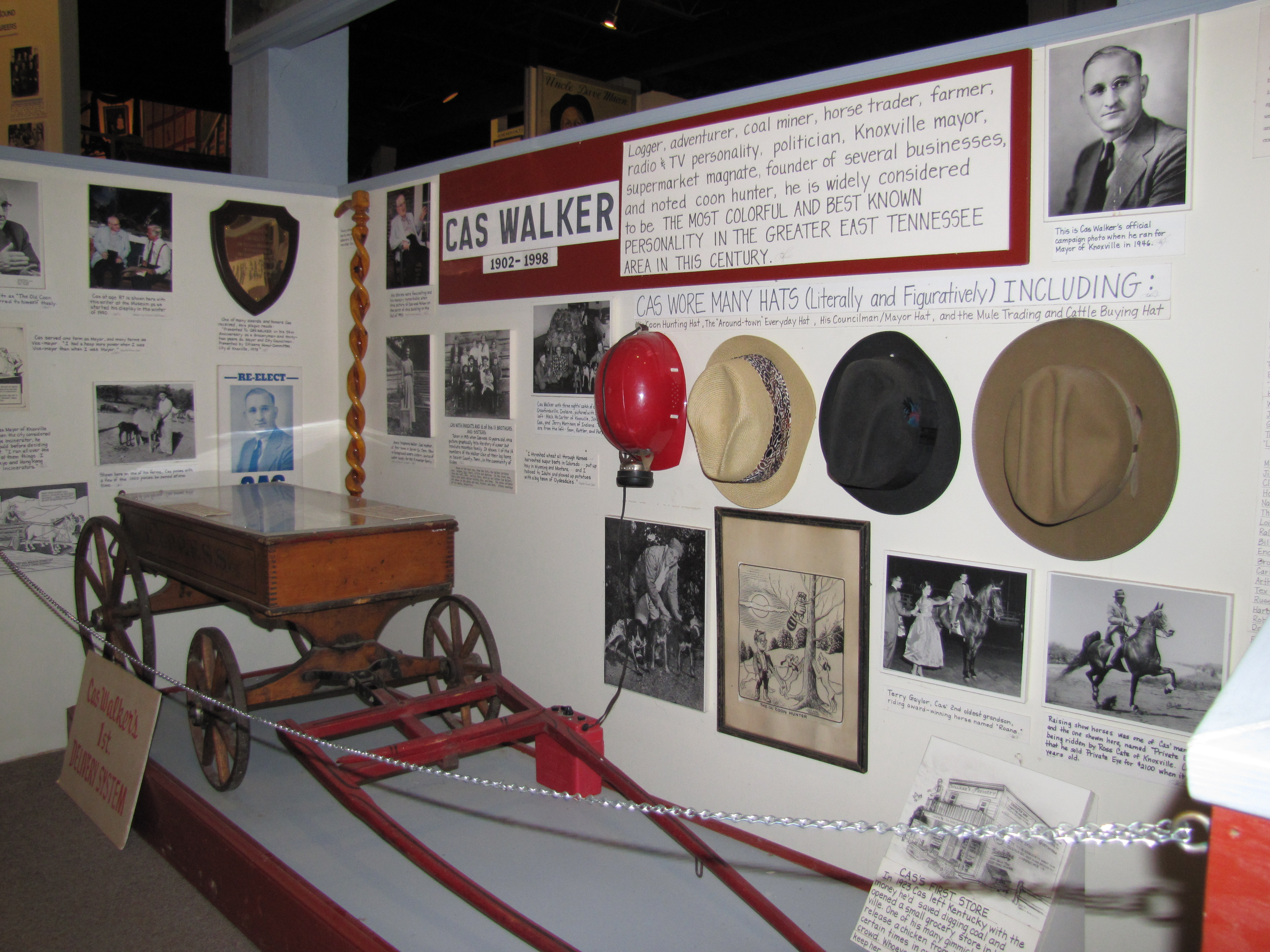
Cas Walker display at the Museum of Appalachia

Walker was first elected to the Knoxville city council in 1941. He was elected mayor in 1946, but after a few weeks of tumultuous meetings and the firing of its own city manager, the city council managed to oust Walker in a recall election. He also served as acting mayor in 1959. Walker was reelected to the city council the following year and remained until voluntarily retiring in 1971. He continued to be a force in Knoxville politics into the 1980s.

As a politician, Walker successfully portrayed himself as a champion of small farmers and the working class. This image was enhanced in 1956 when Life Magazine published a photograph of Walker preparing to punch fellow city councilman J. S. Cooper after the two had engaged in a heated debate over property assessments. In his self-published newsletter, The Watchdog, Walker blasted political opponents and raged against tax increases. He also used The Watchdog to launch controversial attacks against his business competitors. In the 1960s, he unsuccessfully opposed plans to fluoridate Knoxville's water supply and played a pivotal role in derailing attempts to consolidate the governments of Knoxville and Knox County. Walker's political mentor-turned-rival, George Dempster, once said, "If I ordered a whole carload of SOB's and they just sent Cas, I'd sign for the shipment."

Walker continued distributing The Watchdog until the early 1980s, when a libel suit forced it out of publication. During the same period, Walker's influence helped defeat a second attempt to merge the Knoxville and Knox County governments.

== Radio and television ==
In 1929, Walker created a variety show known as the Farm and Home Hour to help promote his cash stores. The show initially aired as a radio program on WROL-AM and later on WIVK-AM. In 1953, the show adopted a television format for WROL-TV (now WATE-TV) and aired on various local channels until 1983. The show featured artists such as Roy Acuff, Jimmy Martin, Bill Monroe, Carl Smith, Carl Butler, Jim Nabors, and Chet Atkins. The show also helped launch the careers of Dolly Parton, who first performed on the program in 1956 at the age of 10, and The Everly Brothers, who were regulars on the show in the mid-1950s.

== Personal life ==
He died at 96 in 1998. A storefront at Dollywood is called "Cas Walker's General Store" in his honor.
