= Caswell–Taylor House =

Historic house in Tennessee, United States

Coordinates: 35.9787°N 83.9177°W

- Caswell-Taylor House
- Formerly listed on the U.S. National Register of Historic Places
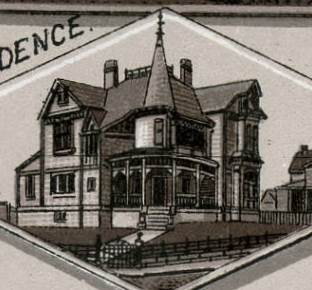
- Drawing of the Caswell-Taylor House, from a souvenir collection published in 1889.
- Location: 803 North Fourth Avenue, Knoxville, TN
- Built: 1886
- Architect: Albert Baumann, Joseph Baumann
- Architectural style: Late Victorian, Stick/eastlake, Queen Anne
- NRHP reference No.: 83004253

Significant dates
- Added to NRHP: November 10, 1983
- Removed from NRHP: August 1, 1986

The Caswell–Taylor House was a historic home located at 803 North Fourth Avenue in the Fourth and Gill neighborhood of Knoxville, Tennessee. It is also known as The Governor's House, as it was the home of Governor Robert Love Taylor for several years.

The house included a variety of architectural styles, including Queen Anne, Late Victorian and Eastlake. The property, a private residence, was on the National Register of Historic Places.
