= Old North Knoxville =

Neighborhood in Knoxville, Tennessee, United States

- Old North Knoxville Historic District
- U.S. National Register of Historic Places
- U.S. Historic district
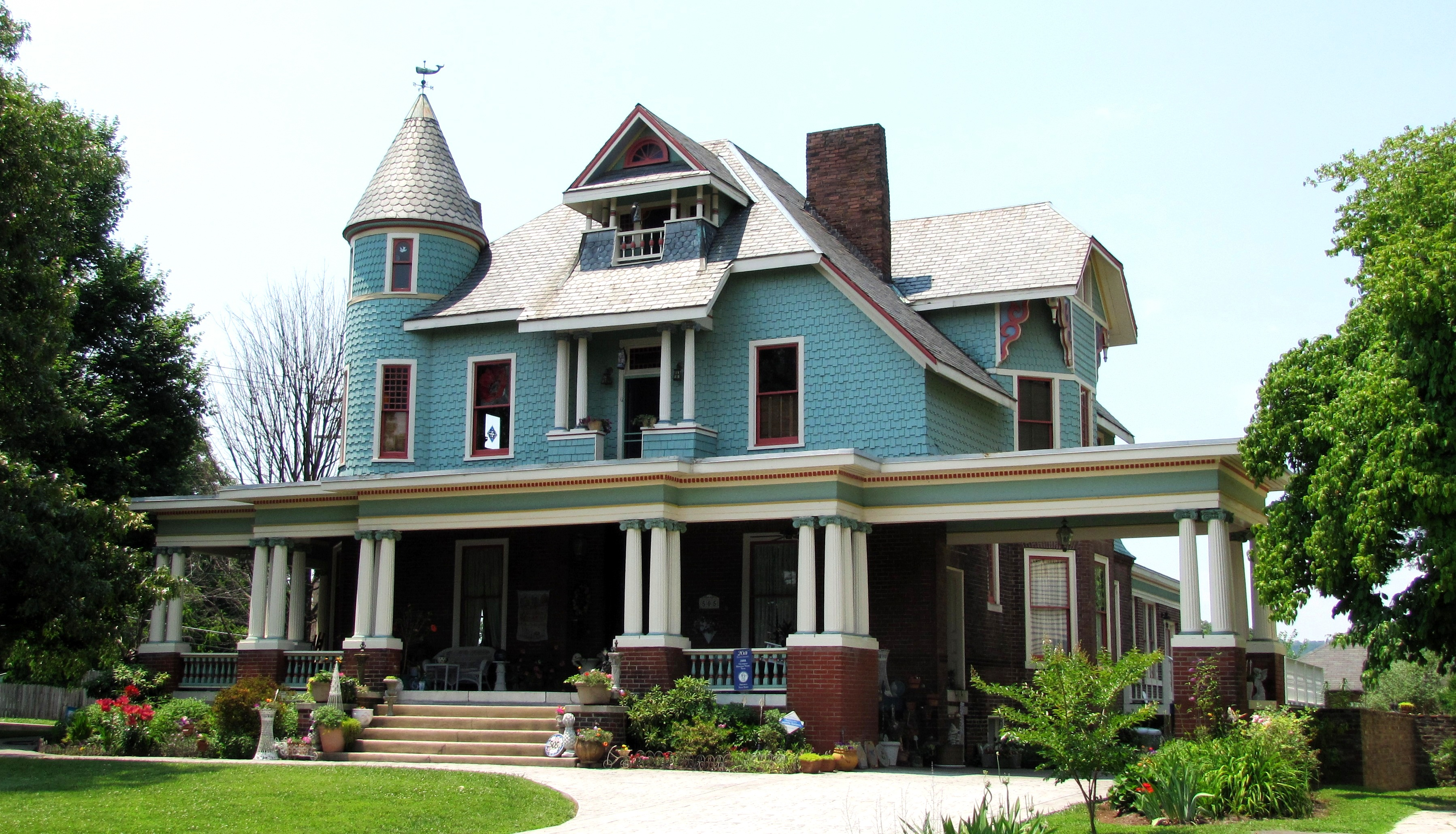
- Lou Mar (505 East Scott Avenue), built in 1889

- Location within Tennessee Location within the United States
- Location: Roughly bounded by E. Woodland, Bluff, Armstrong, E. Baxter, and Central Aves. Knoxville, Tennessee
- Coordinates: 35°59′13.03″N 83°55′18″W
- Area: 324 acres (131 ha)
- Built: c. 1883–1940
- Architect: George Barber, Charles I. Barber, David Getaz, and multiple others
- Architectural style: Bungalow/Craftsman, Late Victorian, Late-19th and 20th Century Revivals
- NRHP reference No.: 92000506
- Added to NRHP: May 14, 1992

Old North Knoxville is a neighborhood in Knoxville, Tennessee, United States, located just north of the city's downtown area. Initially established as the town of North Knoxville in 1889, the area was a prominent suburb for Knoxville's upper middle and professional classes until the 1950s. After a period of decline, preservationists began restoring many of the neighborhood's houses in the 1980s. In 1992, over 400 houses and secondary structures in the neighborhood were added to the National Register of Historic Places as the Old North Knoxville Historic District.

In the years following the Civil War, Knoxville experienced an economic boom that brought about a rapid increase in the city's population. The city gradually expanded northward and westward to accommodate the influx of new residents. The housing boom reached what is now Old North Knoxville in the late 1880s, when it was incorporated as the town of North Knoxville, and continued after its annexation by Knoxville in 1897. The neighborhood's earliest residents included doctors, politicians, and business managers, and some its earliest houses were designed by prominent Knoxville architects, such as George Barber, Charles Barber, and David Getaz. As Knoxville continued expanding northward, most notably with the annexation of Fountain City in 1962, North Knoxville became "Old" North Knoxville.

== Location ==
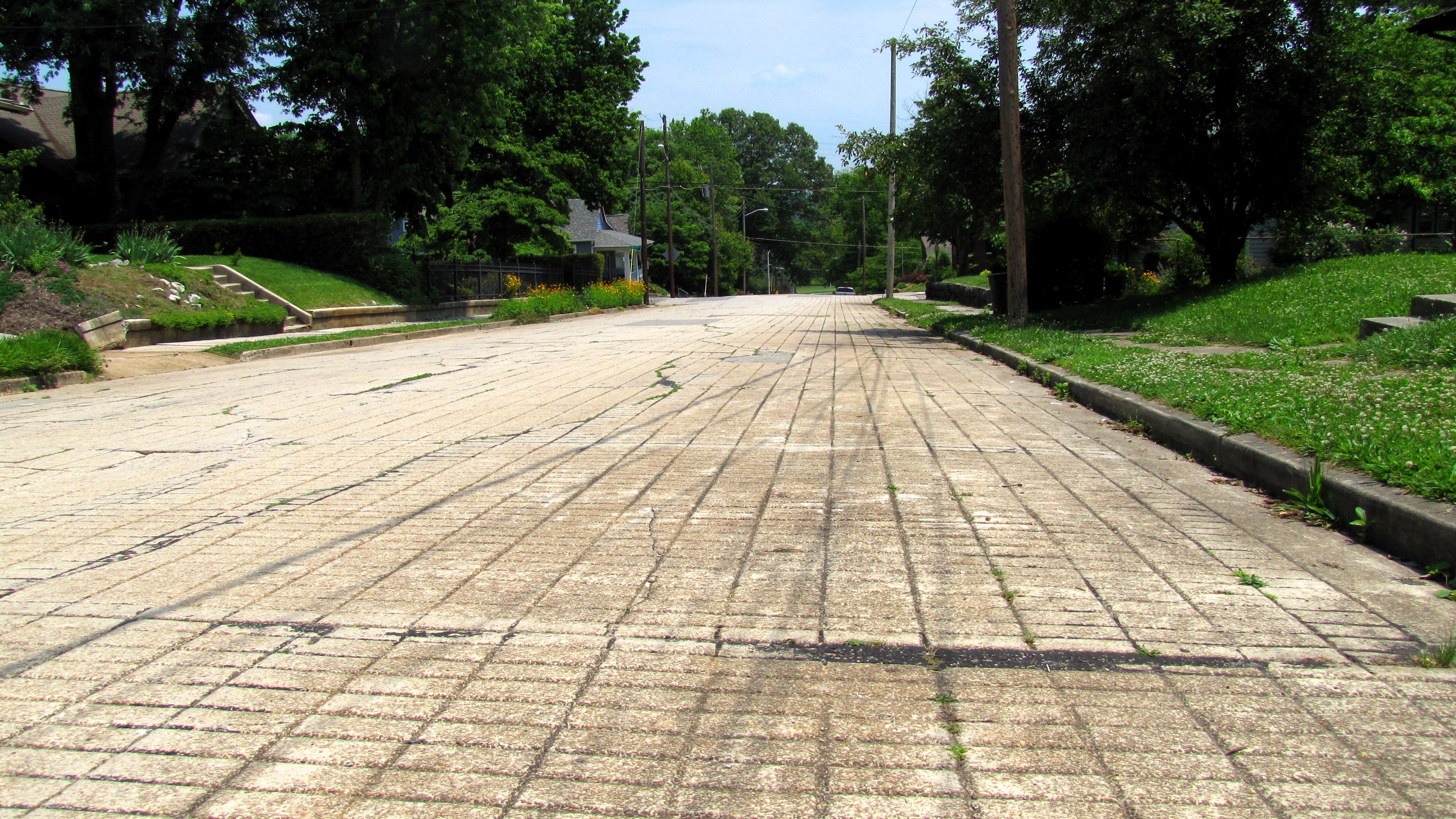
Circa-1907 "Granitoid," or "singing," pavement along Kenyon Street

Old North Knoxville is located just off Broadway (part of U.S. Route 441), about halfway between downtown Knoxville to the south and Sharp's Ridge to the north. The neighborhood straddles a hill that gradually rises from First Creek and descends toward Second Creek. East Scott Avenue traverses the hill's crest, with the slopes gradually descending southward to East Baxter Avenue and northward to East Woodland Avenue, leaving the houses along East Scott approximately 20 to 40 feet higher than other houses in the neighborhood.

The Old North Knoxville Historic District is roughly bounded by East Woodland Avenue to the northwest, Bluff Street to the northeast, Armstrong Avenue to the east, and Central Avenue to the south. Several other historic districts lie in the vicinity, namely Mechanicsville to the southwest, Fourth and Gill to the south, Park City to the east, and North Hills to the northeast.

== History ==
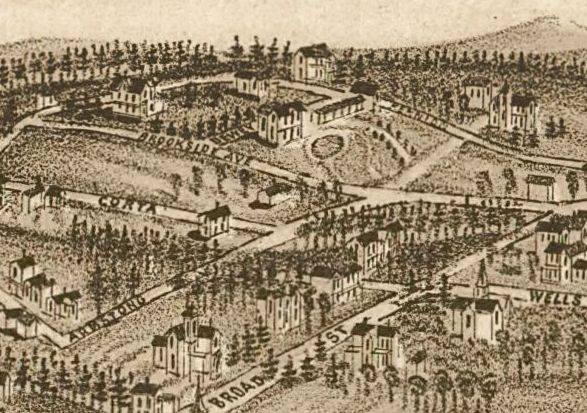
Detail of an 1886 map showing what is now the Old North Knoxville area

North Knoxville remained predominantly rural until the latter half of the 19th century. An 1871 map of Knoxville shows scant development along "Broad Street" (Broadway) north of the Knoxville National Cemetery. In the years after the Civil War, however, Knoxville's railroad access and an influx of northern capital helped make Knoxville a major warehousing and textile manufacturing center, bringing about an exponential increase in population. By 1886, several houses and several roads (including Armstrong and "Kennion") had been built in what is now Old North Knoxville, and several factories had been built nearby along Second Creek, namely the Brookside Cotton Mill, the Fantz (Fanz) Sausage Factory, and two marble works.

Rather than wait for annexation by Knoxville in order to obtain city services, North Knoxville incorporated as a separate city on January 16, 1889. L. A. Gratz was elected as the town's first mayor. The new town secured contracts for water and electric lighting deemed superior to the contracts Knoxville had forged, and North Knoxville School was held in high esteem by parents. At the time of its incorporation, North Knoxville was considered one of the best residential neighborhoods in Knoxville, due in part to its relatively small concentration of lower class residents, and by 1895, the town had a population of 3,200. North Knoxville was annexed by Knoxville in 1897.

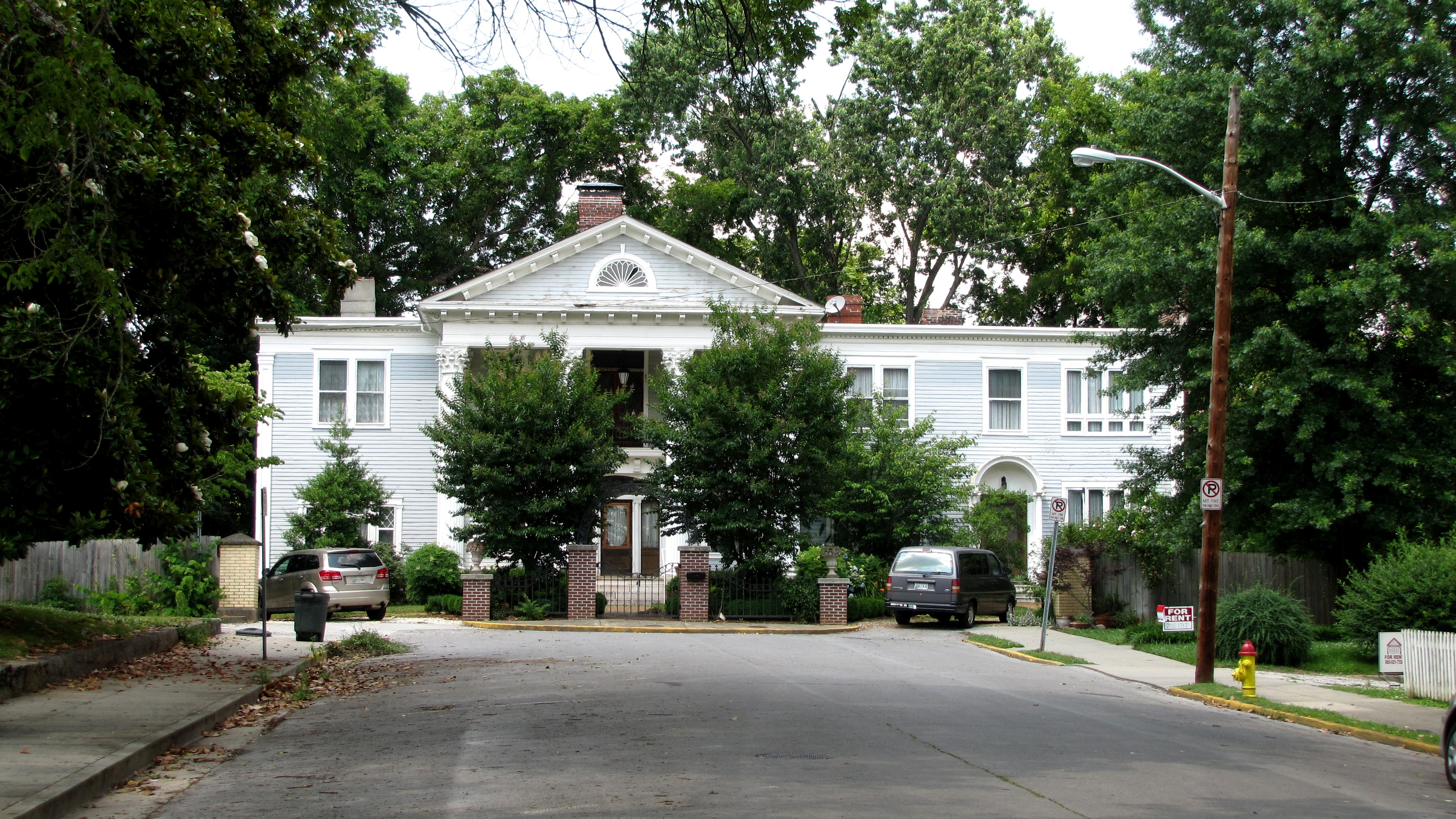
The Neoclassical-style Dunn Mansion, built in 1905

By the early 1900s, trolley tracks connected North Knoxville to downtown Knoxville. The neighborhood consisted primarily of upper middle and professional class residents, including business managers, doctors, lawyers, and professors. One section of Glenwood Avenue was known as "Doctors' Hill," since nearly every home on the block was occupied by a physician. Business leaders living in the neighborhood included Brookside Cotton Mill manager William Lang, H. T. Hackney Company president (and later mayor of Knoxville) Benjamin Morton, and several Southern Railway officials. George Dempster, inventor of the Dempster-Dumpster and a mayor of Knoxville, lived in Old North Knoxville in the 1920s.

North Knoxville continued to grow until the 1940s, by which time most of the original residents had died or moved away. Knoxville's continued expansion northward and westward, as well as the onset of automobile travel, drew the residents of the city's early suburbs further out to newer neighborhoods along the city's periphery. During the 1950s and 1960s, many of the neighborhood's larger houses were converted into low-rent apartments, causing a decline in housing values. The formation of the Old North Knoxville Neighborhood Association in the 1970s, however, led to the restoration and rehabilitation of most of the neighborhood's historic homes.

== Old North Knoxville Historic District ==
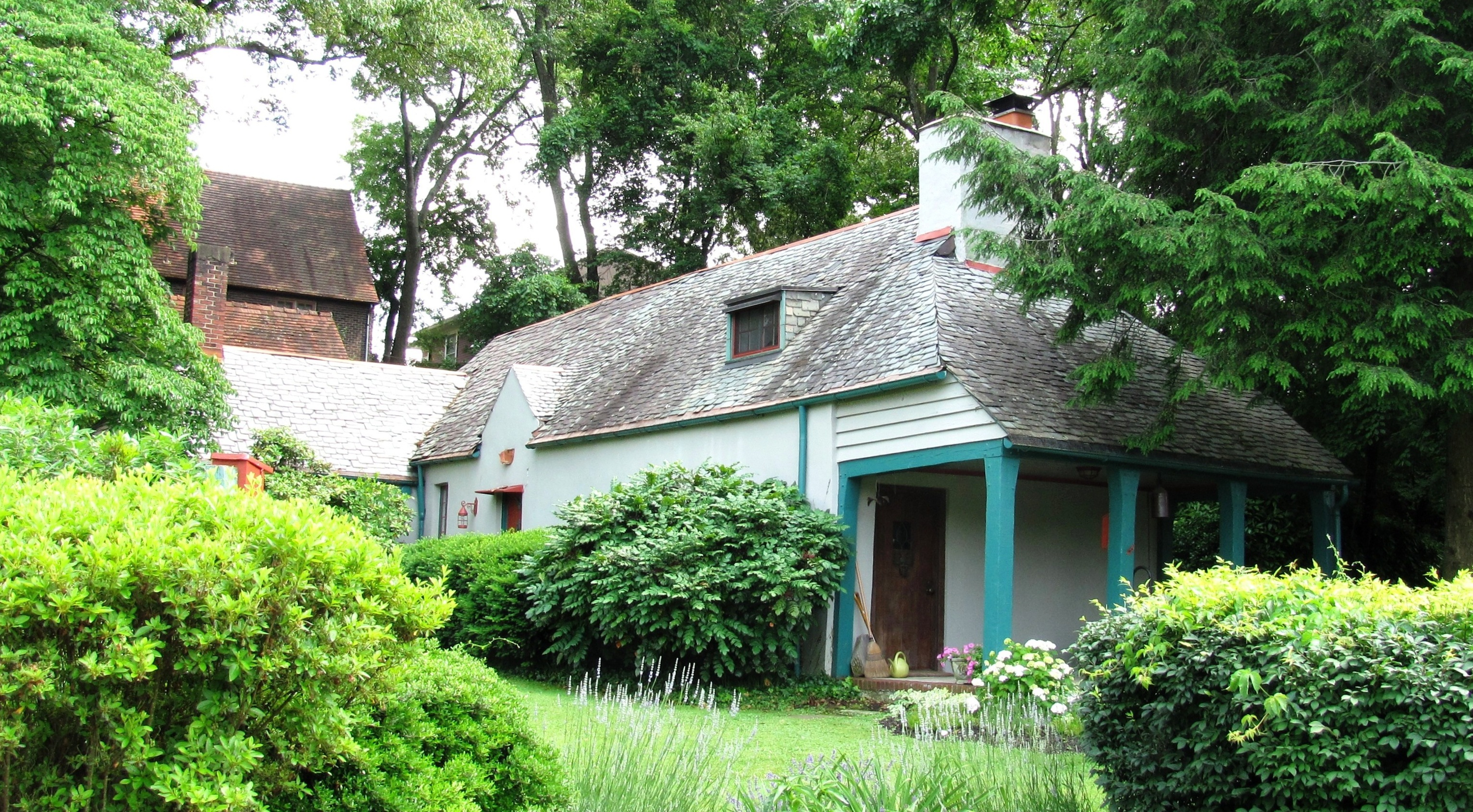
House at 518 Glenwood, designed by Knoxville architect Charles Barber

The Old North Knoxville Historic District covers 324 acres (131 ha), and includes properties along Alexander Street, East Anderson Avenue, Armstrong Avenue, East Baxter Avenue, Cornelia Street, Folsom Avenue, Fremont Place, Glenwood Avenue, Harvey Street, Kenyon Street, Kern Place, Matthews Place, McMillan Street, East Oklahoma Avenue, Rader Place, East Scott Avenue, Shepherd Place, Stewart Place, Thompson Place, and East Woodland Avenue. The district's 496 contributing buildings and structures consist primarily of houses and outbuildings, with one commercial structure. The neighborhood is characterized by short front lawns and large sidewalks. Circa-1907 "Granitoid" pavement, known locally as "singing" pavement due to the sound it makes when cars drive over it, is still found along Kenyon Street.

Houses in Old North Knoxville include designs by three established architects— George F. Barber, his son, Charles Barber, and the Swiss-born David Getaz. Architectural styles represented in the district include Queen Anne, Eastlake, Folk Victorian, Bungalow/Craftsman, Dutch Colonial Revival, Tudor Revival, Neoclassical Revival, American Foursquare, and Shingle. The district has one Colonial Revival home (517 East Oklahoma) and one home designed in the French Eclectic style (518 Glenwood).

=== Notable houses ===
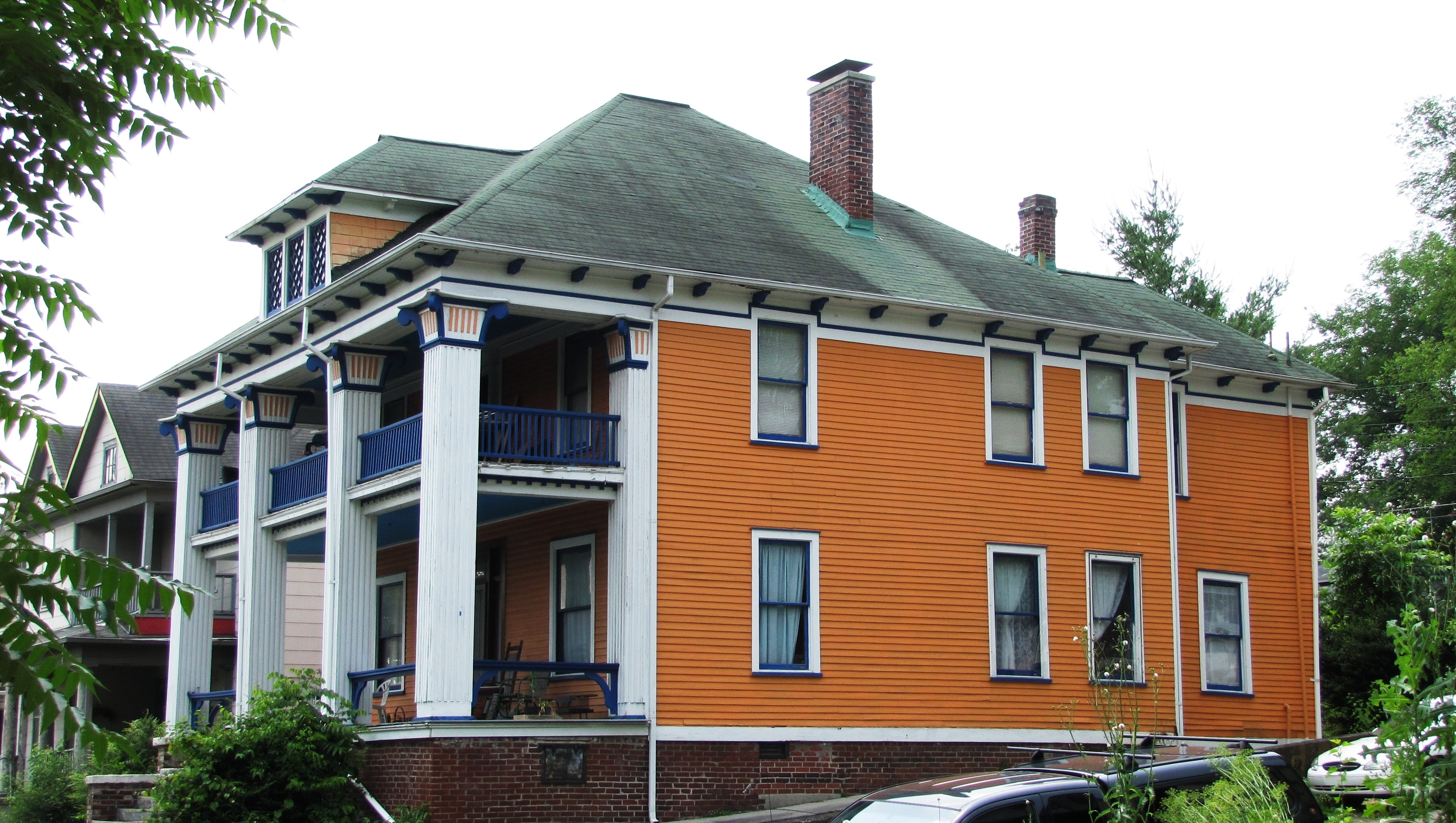
House at 131 East Oklahoma Avenue, built circa 1910

- W. R. Cooper House (1212 Kenyon Ave.), a Folk Victorian house built circa 1883, moved approximately one block to its present location in 1900.
- Thomas Fitzgerald House (311 Glenwood Ave.), a Folk Victorian house built circa 1888.
- Lou-Mar (505 East Scott Avenue), built 1889, a Queen Anne-style house designed by architect David Getaz.
- James Eugene Fair House (241 East Scott Ave.), a Queen Anne-style house built in 1896.
- Pine Crest (131 East Scott Avenue), a Folk Victorian house built in 1899 for Brookside Mills manager William Lang, and designed by architect George F. Barber.
- James B. Dunn Mansion (1424 Armstrong Avenue), a large Neoclassical-style house built in 1905.
- 131 East Oklahoma Avenue, a Neoclassical-style house built around 1910, noted for its oversized columns.
- 518 Glenwood Avenue, a French Eclectic-style house built in 1925, and designed by architect Charles I. Barber of the firm, Barber & McMurry.
- George Dempster House (235 East Scott Avenue), an American Foursquare-style house built in 1926; the home of the prominent Knoxville businessman and mayor.
- Marble Hill (125 East Glenwood Avenue), an Arts and Crafts "bungalow mansion" built in 1916, and designed by Martin E. Parmelee. Built for the Samuel T. Buffat family. Buffat was an executive with the H. T. Hackney Company. Fountain City banker William S. McKinney purchased the home in 1920. From 1965 to 2003, it was the home of noted bluegrass musician Daniel E. Bailey, a member of the Bailey Brothers and the Happy Valley Boys. Bailey was also grocer Cas Walker's radio announcer.

== See also ==
- Cornstalk Heights
- Emory Place Historic District
