= Harriman, Tennessee =

- City
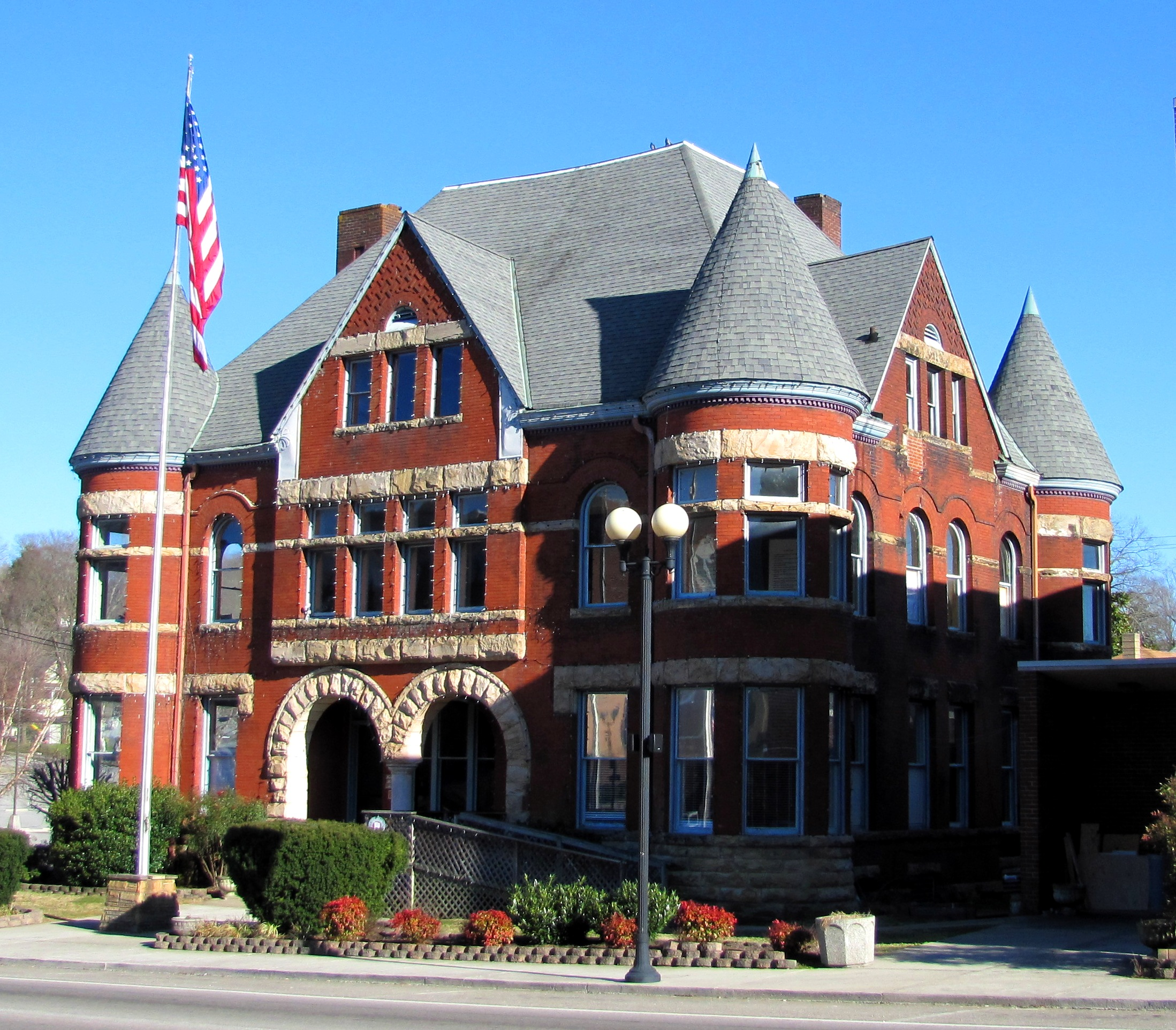
- Harriman City Hall

- Location of Harriman in Roane County, Tennessee
- Coordinates: 35°55′50″N 84°33′37″W
- Country: United States
- State: Tennessee
- Counties: Roane, Morgan
- Incorporated: 1891
- Named for: Walter Harriman

Government
  - Mayor: Wayne Best

Area
  - Total: 10.70 sq mi (27.70 km^{2})
  - Land: 10.50 sq mi (27.19 km^{2})
  - Water: 0.19 sq mi (0.50 km^{2})
- Elevation: 883 ft (269 m)

Population (2020)
  - Total: 5,892
  - Density: 561.2/sq mi (216.68/km^{2})
- Time zone: UTC-5 (Eastern (EST))
  - Summer (DST): UTC-4 (EDT)
- ZIP code: 37748
- Area code: 865
- FIPS code: 47-32520
- GNIS feature ID: 2403803
- Website: www.cityofharriman.net

Harriman is a city located primarily in Roane County, Tennessee, United States, with a small extension into Morgan County. The population of Harriman was 5,892 at the time of the 2020 census.

== Geography ==
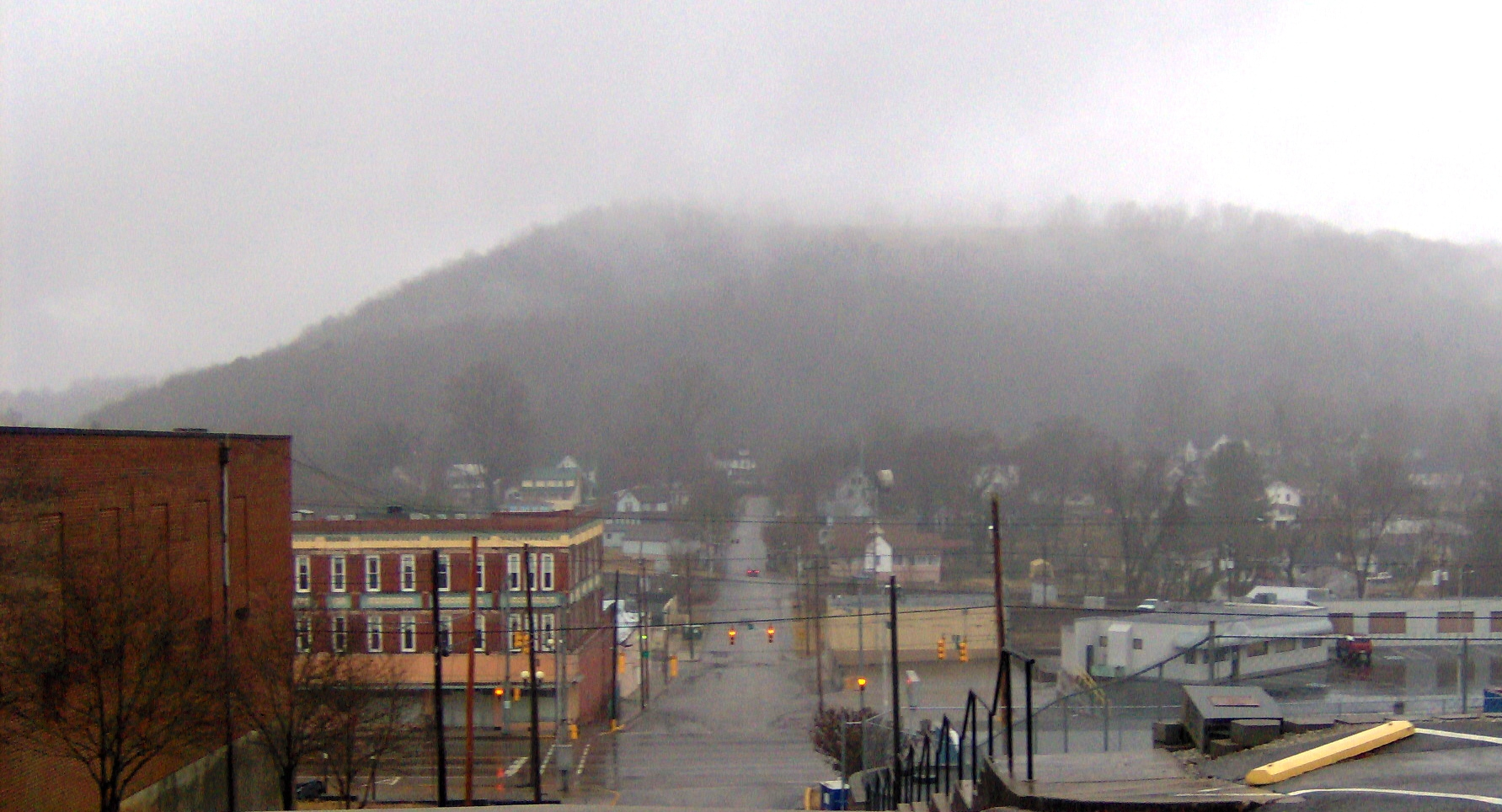
View along Crescent Avenue from Cornstalk Heights, with Walden Ridge in the background

Harriman is situated along the physiographic boundary between the Tennessee Valley region and the Cumberland Plateau region, with the Plateau—namely its Walden Ridge escarpment—rising several hundred feet above the city to the west. The Emory River enters the Tennessee Valley just west of Harriman at a pass known as Emory Gap, and forms an oxbow bend that surrounds the original section of Harriman.

U.S. Route 27, known as Roane Street in Harriman, runs north-to-south through the city along the base of Walden Ridge. Interstate 40 runs east-to-west through the city's southern section. Harriman's southwestern boundary, which it shares with Rockwood, is located along US-27 about a half-mile south of the road's intersection with I-40. The city's southeastern boundary runs along Pine Ridge, which overlooks the Kingston Fossil Plant. Harriman's northern boundary is near US-27's split with State Highway 61.

According to the United States Census Bureau, the city has a total area of 10.6 square miles (27.4 km^{2}), of which 10.4 square miles (26.9 km^{2}) is land and 0.19 square miles (0.5 km^{2}), or 1.86%, is water.

== Demographics ==
Historical population
Census	Pop.	Note	%±
1890	716		—
1900	3,442		380.7%
1910	3,061		−11.1%
1920	4,019		31.3%
1930	4,588		14.2%
1940	5,620		22.5%
1950	6,389		13.7%
1960	5,931		−7.2%
1970	8,734		47.3%
1980	8,303		−4.9%
1990	7,119		−14.3%
2000	6,744		−5.3%
2010	6,350		−5.8%
2020	5,892		−7.2%
2023 (est.)	6,171		4.7%

Harriman is included in the Knoxville metropolitan area.

=== 2020 census ===
As of the 2020 census, Harriman had a population of 5,892, 2,578 households, and 1,408 families residing in the city.

The median age was 41.8 years, with 22.2% of residents under the age of 18 and 19.5% aged 65 years or older; for every 100 females there were 89.6 males and for every 100 females age 18 and over there were 82.5 males.

90.9% of residents lived in urban areas, while 9.1% lived in rural areas.

There were 2,578 households in Harriman, of which 28.2% had children under the age of 18 living in them. Of all households, 34.2% were married-couple households, 21.0% were households with a male householder and no spouse or partner present, and 36.9% were households with a female householder and no spouse or partner present. About 35.7% of all households were made up of individuals and 15.5% had someone living alone who was 65 years of age or older.

There were 3,023 housing units, of which 14.7% were vacant. The homeowner vacancy rate was 2.8% and the rental vacancy rate was 10.8%.

Racial composition as of the 2020 census
Race	Number	Percent
White	5,062	85.9%
Black or African American	352	6.0%
American Indian and Alaska Native	32	0.5%
Asian	38	0.6%
Native Hawaiian and Other Pacific Islander	4	0.1%
Some other race	35	0.6%
Two or more races	369	6.3%
Hispanic or Latino (of any race)	115	2.0%

=== 2000 census ===
As of the census of 2000, there was a population of 6,744, with 2,907 households and 1,802 families residing in the city. The population density was 671.5 inhabitants per square mile (259.3/km^{2}). There were 3,309 housing units at an average density of 329.5 per square mile (127.2/km^{2}). The racial makeup of the city was 90.11% White, 7.43% African American, 0.22% Native American, 0.27% Asian, 0.01% Pacific Islander, 0.18% from other races, and 1.78% from two or more races. Hispanic or Latino of any race were 0.76% of the population.

There were 2,907 households, out of which 24.8% had children under the age of 18 living with them, 41.9% were married couples living together, 15.6% had a female householder with no husband present, and 38.0% were non-families. 34.1% of all households were made up of individuals, and 15.9% had someone living alone who was 65 years of age or older. The average household size was 2.25 and the average family size was 2.88.

In the city, the population was spread out, with 21.9% under the age of 18, 8.7% from 18 to 24, 25.6% from 25 to 44, 23.8% from 45 to 64, and 20.0% who were 65 years of age or older. The median age was 40 years. For every 100 females, there were 83.8 males. For every 100 females age 18 and over, there were 78.5 males.

The median income for a household in the city was $23,736, and the median income for a family was $31,190. Males had a median income of $26,616 versus $20,278 for females. The per capita income for the city was $14,763. About 18.6% of families and 22.8% of the population were below the poverty line, including 32.1% of those under age 18 and 18.7% of those age 65 or over.

== History ==
=== East Tennessee Land Company ===
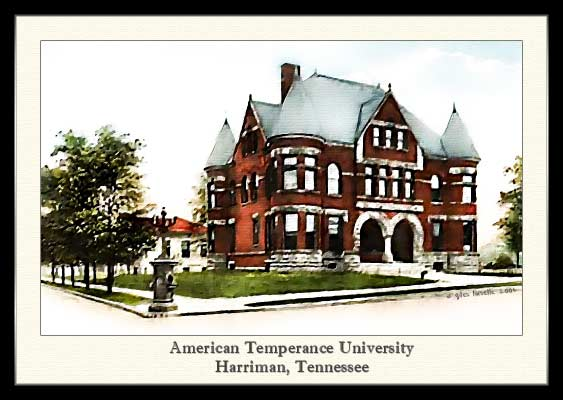
American Temperance University, c.1906

Harriman was founded as a Temperance Town in 1889 by temperance movement activists led by New York-born minister and plant manager Frederick Gates. Seeking a land venture that could attract industrial and economic development while avoiding the vice-driven pitfalls of late 19th century company towns, Gates and fellow prohibitionists chartered the East Tennessee Land Company in May 1889. In subsequent months, the company acquired several hundred thousand acres of land around what is now Harriman, including the plantation of Union Army colonel and state senator, Robert K. Byrd. The company's early investors included 1888 Prohibition Party presidential candidate General Clinton B. Fisk, who served as the company's first president, Quaker Oats co-founder Ferdinand Schumacher, and publishers Isaac K. Funk and A. W. Wagnalls.

The East Tennessee Land Company's plan was to purchase land, build a town based on prohibitionist and other reform movement principles, and establish subsidiary companies to attract industry. After a successful land auction in Harriman in 1890, the company established three subsidiaries: the East Tennessee Mining Company to administer the region's coal and iron extraction operations, the Harriman Coal & Iron Railroad Company to develop the local railroad system, and the Harriman Manufacturing Company to attract industries by providing start-up capital. To project its prosperity and advertise Harriman, the company built an imposing brick headquarters (now Harriman City Hall), with its four picturesque Norman towers, at the corner of Walden Avenue and Roane Street near the center of the new town. By 1892, several rolling mills, factories, and other businesses had relocated to Harriman.

To help finance its early operations, the East Tennessee Land Company borrowed just over one million dollars from the Central Trust Company of New York. In late 1891, capital markets in the U.S. began to freeze, leading to the Panic of 1893. The East Tennessee Land Company, unable to pay the interest on its million-dollar loan, attempted a last-ditch stock sale to raise money to pay off the loan, but the sale failed. In November 1893, the company was forced into bankruptcy.

=== Development of Harriman ===
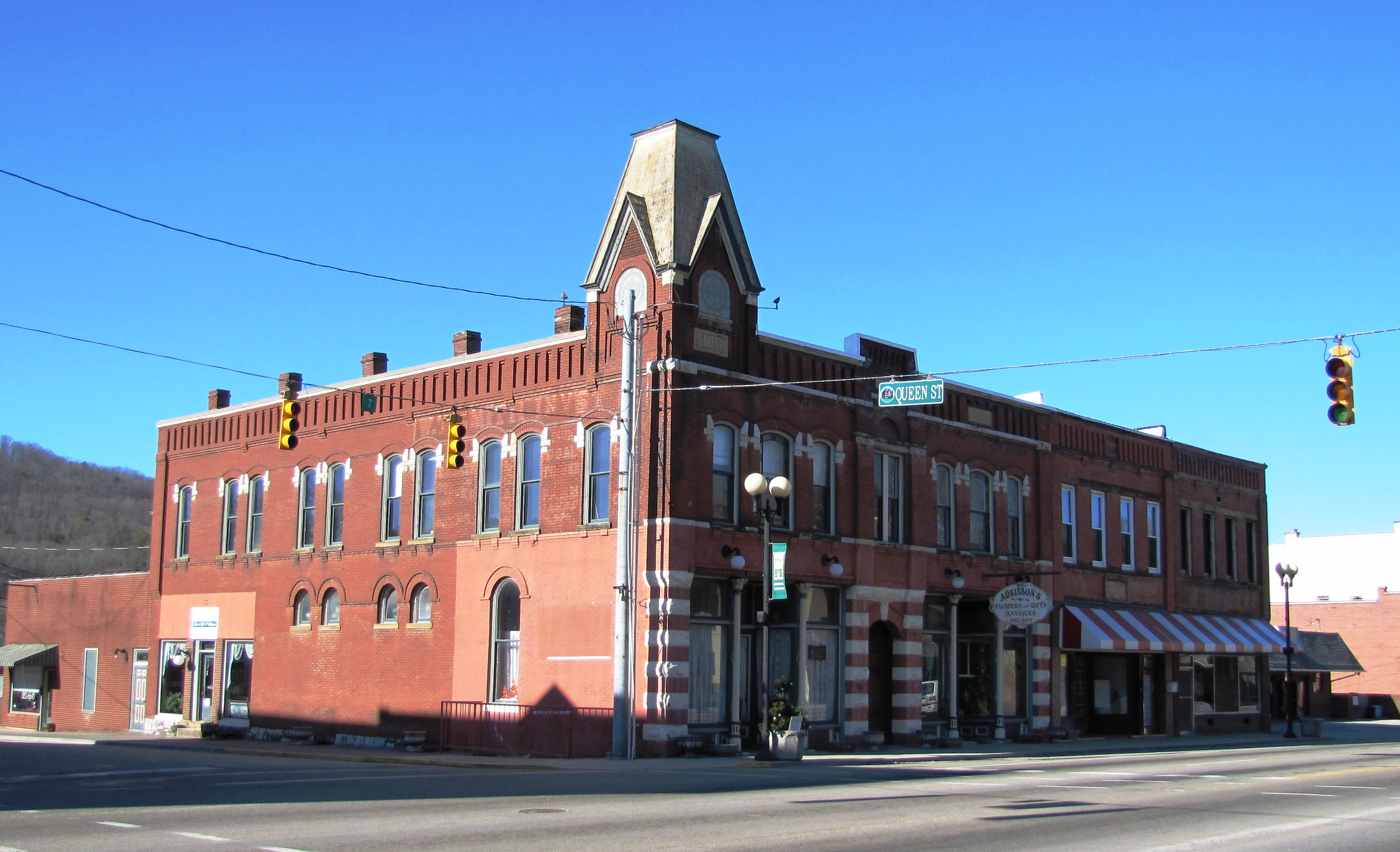
Commercial block along Roane Street, built in the 1890s

Harriman is named for Walter Harriman, a governor of New Hampshire whose son, Walter C. Harriman, was managing director of the East Tennessee Land Company. As a colonel (later general) in the Union Army during the Civil War, he had traveled on foot through the area with his 11th New Hampshire Regiment and camped for several days on the Emory River near the future site of the city. An elderly local later told the directors that Harriman had said that the site would be the perfect place for a town, and based on this conversation, the directors chose the name of "Harriman".

The site of Harriman was chosen primarily for its proximity to Emory Gap, where the Cincinnati Southern Railway joined the East Tennessee, Virginia and Georgia Railway. The city, platted on Christmas Day in 1889, was laid out in a grid pattern that conformed to the Emory's oxbow bend at the base of Walden Ridge. The block bounded by Roane, Walden, Morgan, and Clinton streets was set aside for the city's public buildings (this block is now the location of the city hall, library, and fire department). Lots in the heights around Cumberland and Clinton streets (now Cornstalk Heights) were substantially larger, as it was expected that the city's wealthy and professional-class residents would buy homes here. The areas along the river (Emory Street) were for mills and residential areas for skilled laborers.

The initial land auction for Harriman was held in late February 1890, and was attended by over 4,000 prospective buyers from across the nation. Several hundred lots were sold, raising over $600,000. The most expensive lots were along Roane Street and in what is now Cornstalk Heights, most of which sold for over $2,000 apiece, while the lots closer to the river typically sold for less than $500 apiece. Shortly after the initial auction, the company platted several more lots outside the city in what is now the Walnut Hills and Oak View neighborhoods for the city's wage workers.

=== 20th century ===
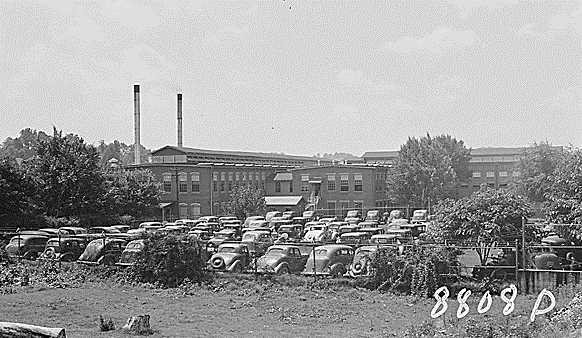
Harriman Hosiery Mills in 1940

In spite of the East Tennessee Land Company's collapse, Harriman continued to grow, although its growth was very gradual. The American Temperance University was established in 1894, and operated out of the East Tennessee Land Company's abandoned headquarters. In 1929, the combination of the stock market crash and a devastating flood of the Emory River wiped out much of the city's industry. A paper mill and two hosiery mills provided the largest share of jobs in the city through the rest of the twentieth century, with the paper mill (a Mead Corporation property) and the hosiery companies (Harriman Hosiery, formerly a Burlington Corp. plant, and independent Roane Hosiery) operating into the 1980s.

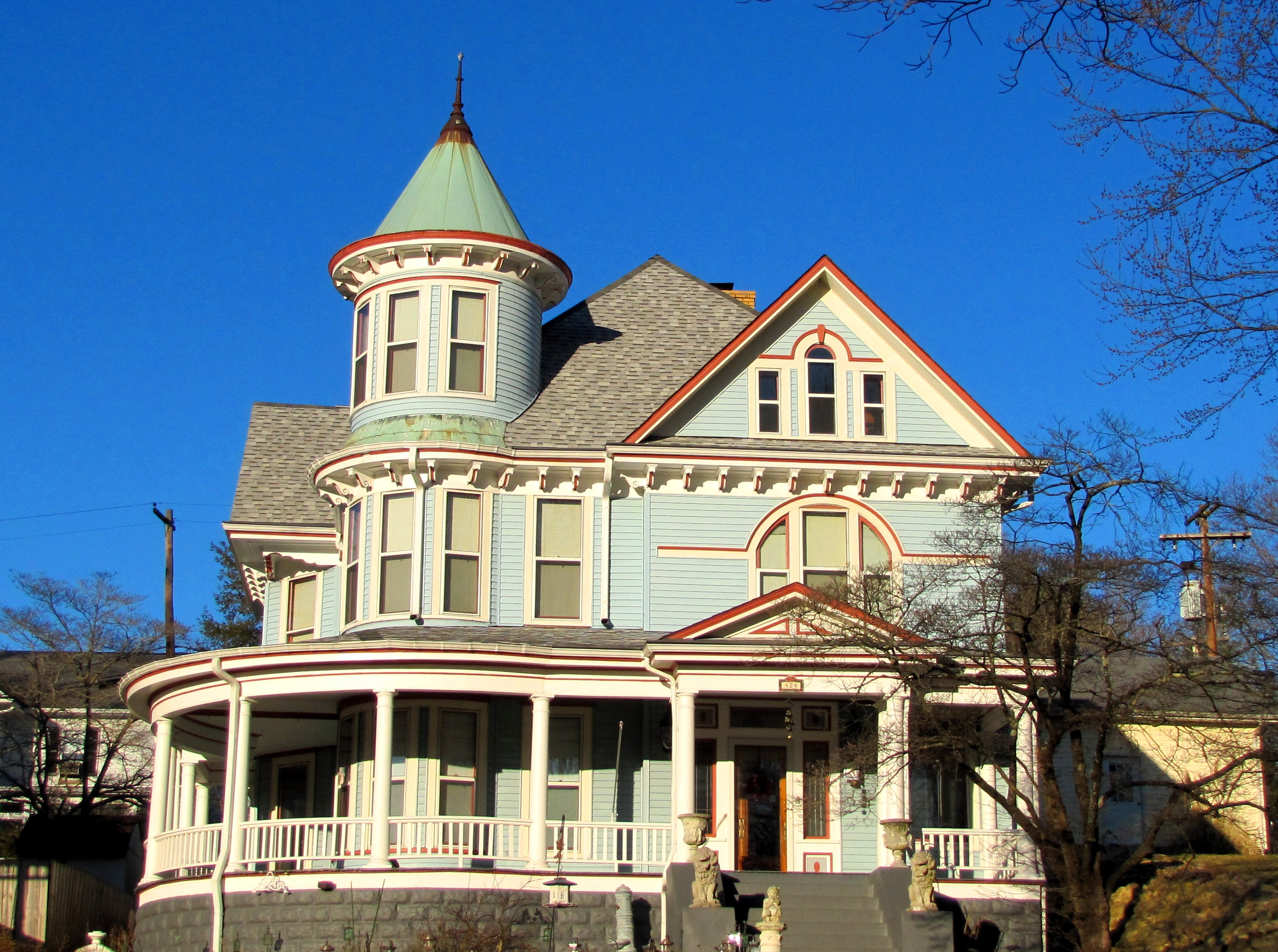
Circa-1890s Queen Anne-style house in Cornstalk Heights

The city got a boost in the 1940s and 1950s from heavy automobile traffic along US-27, which was a primary route connecting the Great Lakes region with Florida before I-75 was completed. The routing of Interstate 40 through southwestern Harriman connected the community more closely with Knoxville but never produced the kind of modern industrial development inside the town that community leaders expected.

The city, still quaint but clearly different now from its economic heyday, still shows considerable evidence of being a "planned community". Its streets still remain in its original grid pattern, as the collapse of the East Tennessee Land Company in 1893 "froze" the city in its original developmental state. There remains a considerable number of homes—especially in Cornstalk Heights—displaying Victorian architecture as well—many of which have been either painstakingly maintained or restored. The Temperance heritage was slow to depart. There was no liquor store in Harriman until 1992.

== Education ==
Harriman was home to American Temperance University from 1893 until 1908.

Harriman's K-12 public schools are operated by the Roane County school system:

- Bowers Elementary - grades K–5
- Harriman Middle - grades 6–8
- Harriman High School - grades 9–12

Institutions of higher education include the main campus of Roane State Community College (located just outside Harriman city limits) and the Tennessee College of Applied Technology - Harriman, located just north of the city.

== Newspapers ==
Tennessee Magnet Publications

== Sports ==
The city was home to a Minor League Baseball team called the Harriman Boosters that played in the Appalachian League in 1914.

== Notable people ==
- Sharrieffa Barksdale (b. 1961), Olympic hurdler
- Robert K. Byrd (1823–1885), Union Army colonel and state senator
- Jeremaine Copeland (b. 1977), professional football player and coach
- Dixie Lee (1911–1952), singer and actress, first wife of Bing Crosby
- Jennifer Lien (b. 1974); actress
- J. C. Powell (1926–1988), academic, former president of Eastern Kentucky University
- Steve Summers, costume designer and creative director for Dolly Parton
