= List of Tennessee suffragists =

This is a list of Tennessee suffragists, suffrage groups and others associated with the cause of women's suffrage in Tennessee.

== Groups ==
- Tennessee Equal Suffrage Association.

== Suffragists ==
- Mattie E. Coleman (1870–1943) – physician, suffragist.
- Maria Thompson Daviess (1872–1924) – co-founder and vice-president of the Equal Suffrage League chapter in Nashville, Tennessee; organizer of the Equal Suffrage League chapter in Madison, Tennessee.
- Anne Dallas Dudley (1876–1955) – suffrage activist; in 1920, she, along with Abby Crawford Milton and Catherine Talty Kenny, led the campaign in Tennessee to approve ratification of the Nineteenth Amendment to the United States Constitution
- Abby Crawford Milton (1881–1991) – traveled throughout Tennessee making speeches and organizing suffrage leagues in small communities; in 1920, she, along with Anne Dallas Dudley and Catherine Talty Kenny, led the campaign in Tennessee to approve ratification of the Nineteenth Amendment to the US Constitution
- Juno Frankie Pierce, also known as Frankie Pierce or J. Frankie Pierce (1864–1954) – African-American suffragist.
- Julia Sears (1840–1929) – pioneering academic, suffragist in Tennessee.

== Suffragists campaigning in Tennessee ==
- Margaret Foley.
- Edna Buckman Kearns.
