= Tennessee Woman Suffrage Monument =

Sculpture in Nashville, Tennessee

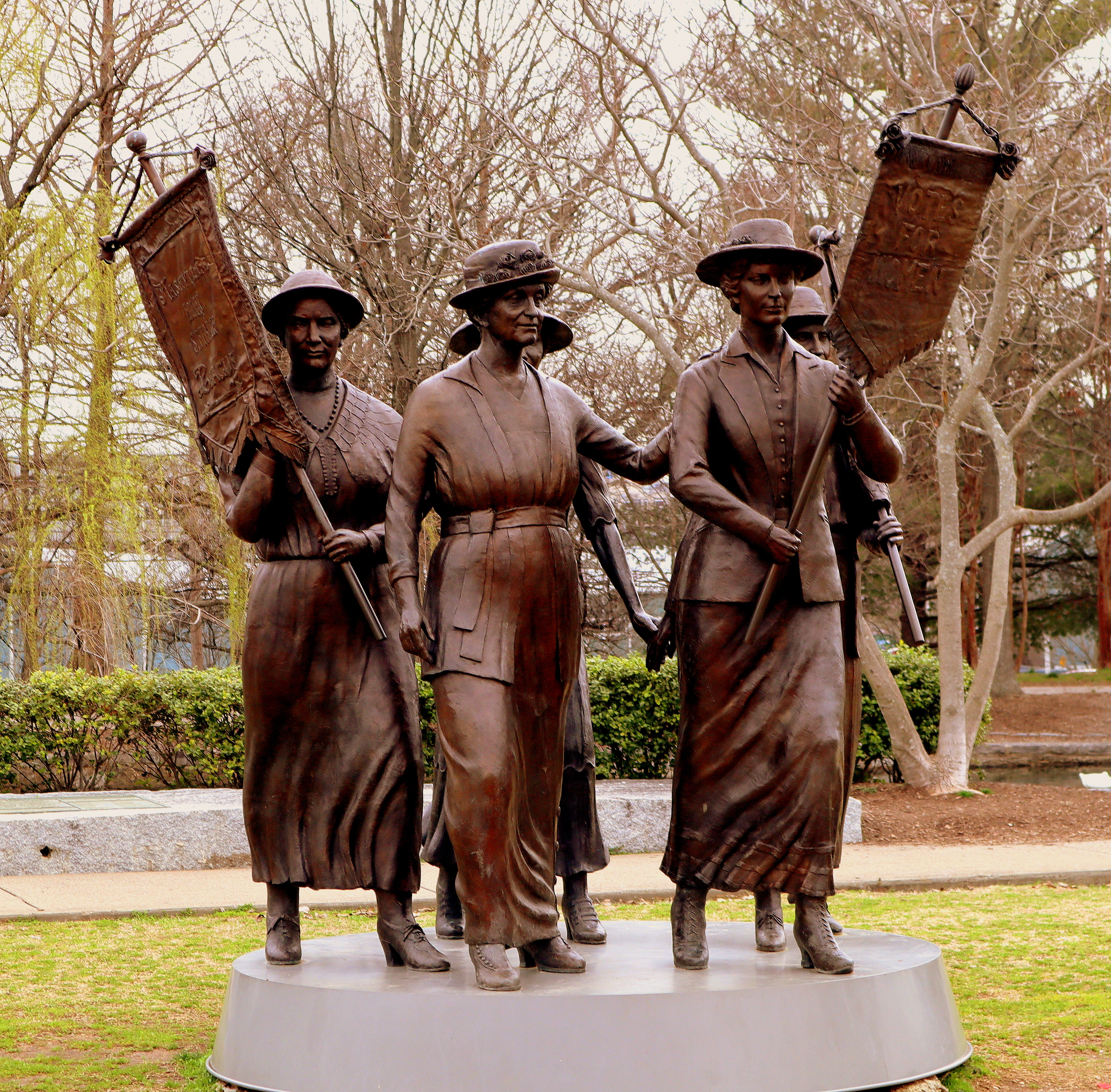
- Artist: Alan LeQuire
- Year: 2016
- Location: Nashville, Tennessee

The Tennessee Woman Suffrage Monument is a monument located in Centennial Park in Nashville, Tennessee. It was created by Alan LeQuire.

The monument was unveiled on August 26, 2016, as part of Women's Equality Day. It features depictions of Carrie Chapman Catt, Anne Dallas Dudley, Abby Crawford Milton, Juno Frankie Pierce, and Sue Shelton White, local activists for women's suffrage.

The monument was dedicated in 2020, marking the 100th year anniversary of Tennessee being the final state needed to ratify the Nineteenth Amendment to the United States Constitution, giving women the right to vote across the United States.

== See also ==
- List of monuments and memorials to women's suffrage
- Tennessee Woman Suffrage Memorial, also by Alan LeQuire
