= Tennessee Woman Suffrage Memorial =

Bronze sculpture in Knoxville, Tennessee

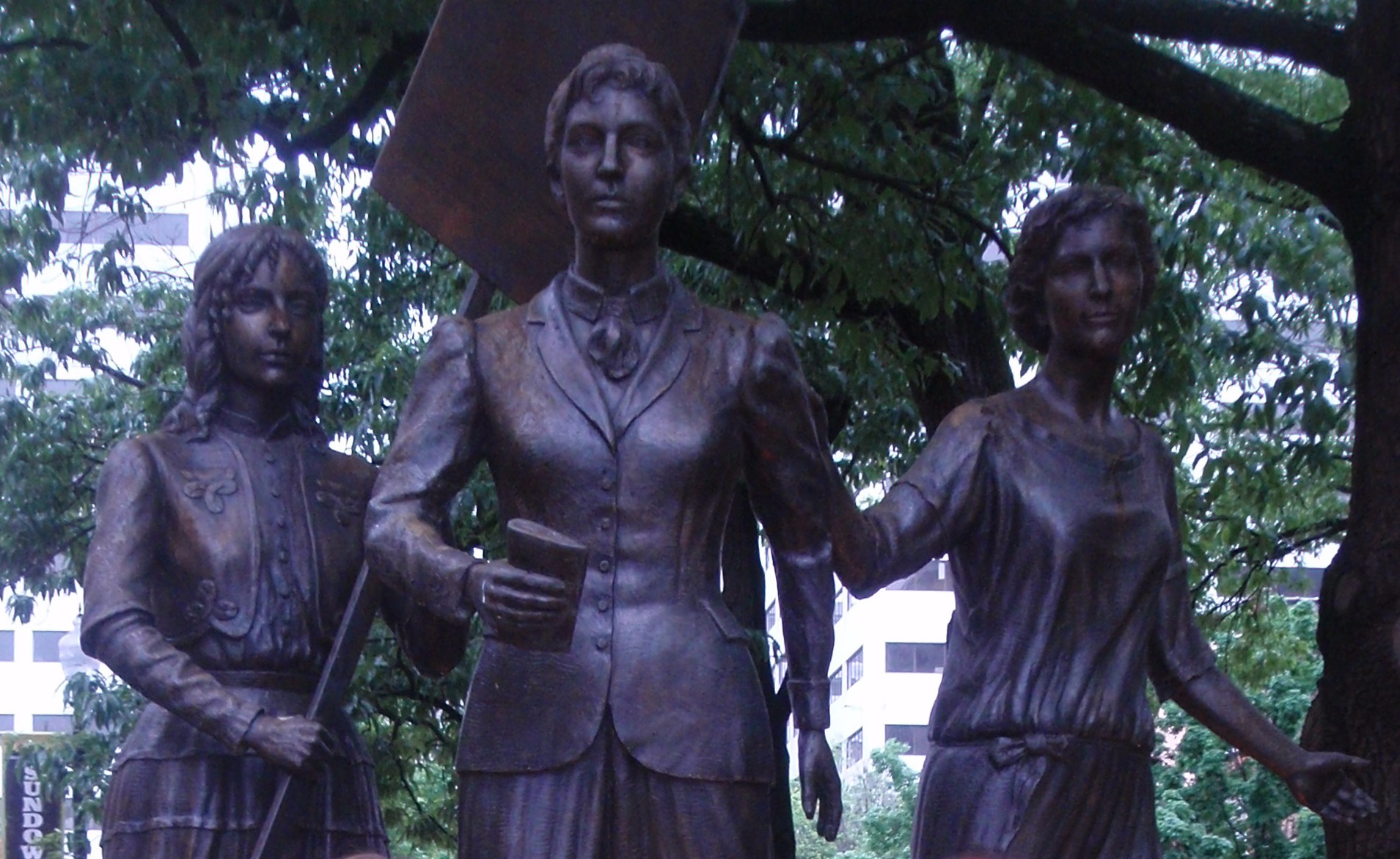
- Left to right: Elizabeth Avery Meriwether, Lizzie Crozier French, and Anne Dallas Dudley
- Artist: Alan LeQuire
- Year: 2006
- Type: Bronze
- Location: Knoxville, Tennessee; 35°57′53″N 83°55′10″W

The Tennessee Woman Suffrage Memorial is located at Market Square in downtown Knoxville, Tennessee, United States. It honors the women who campaigned for the state to ratify the Nineteenth Amendment to the United States Constitution to give women the right to vote. Tennessee was the final state to ratify the amendment and have it added to the Constitution, and thus was the focus of considerable effort both from local women and women who travelled from other states to assist them. The ratification vote was passed on August 18, 1920.

The sculpture was commissioned by the Suffrage Coalition and designed and created by Alan LeQuire. It was unveiled on August 26, 2006, as part of a day of commemorations, which included a re-enactment of a suffrage march, with women in vintage clothes and replica sashes, and carrying replica banners. Martha Craig Daughtrey was the speaker at the unveiling; she was the first female judge on a Tennessee court of appeals and the first woman on the Tennessee Supreme Court.

The bronze sculpture depicts three women who were leading campaigners for women's suffrage: Elizabeth Avery Meriwether of Memphis, Lizzie Crozier French of Knoxville, and Anne Dallas Dudley of Nashville. The base of the sculpture features text on the campaign and a number of quotations from the campaigners, including the following by Harriot Eaton Stanton Blatch:

"All honor to women, the first disenfranchised class in history who unaided by any political party, won enfranchisement by its own effort alone, and achieved the victory without the shedding of a drop of human blood."

== See also ==
- List of monuments and memorials to women's suffrage
- Tennessee Woman Suffrage Monument, also by Alan LeQuire
