= Susan White =

Susan or Sue White may refer to:

- Susan Clarencieux, née White, lady-in-waiting to Mary I of England
- Sue Shelton White (died 1943), suffragist from Henderson, Tennessee
- Susan Dorothea White (born 1941), artist
- Sue White, a character in the British sitcom Green Wing
