= Alan LeQuire =

American sculptor (born 1955)

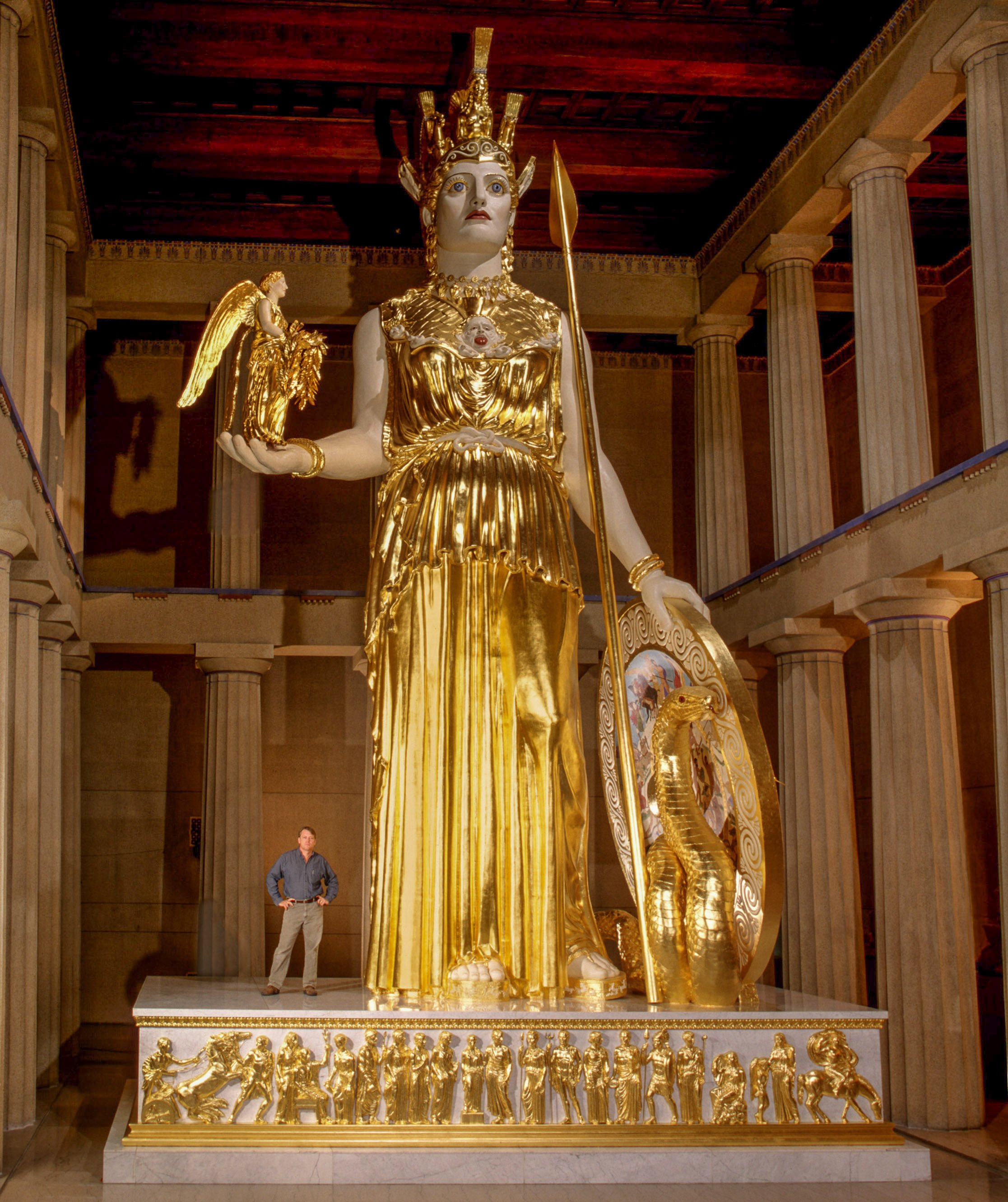
- Alan LeQuire at the bottom of his replica of Phidias' Athena Parthenos in Nashville.
- Born: 1955 (age 70–71); Nashville, Tennessee, U.S.
- Education: Vanderbilt University; University of North Carolina at Greensboro
- Occupation: Sculptor
- Parent: Virgil LeQuire

Alan LeQuire (born 1955) is an American sculptor from Nashville, Tennessee. Many of his sculptures are installed in the city.

== Early life ==
Alan LeQuire was born in 1955. His father, Virgil, was a physician and researcher on the faculty of Vanderbilt University School of Medicine. His mother, Louise, was a painter, art teacher, and writer. The young LeQuire showed an early interest in sculpture. While an undergraduate at Vanderbilt University, he studied independently under professor of sculpture Puryear Mims and Middle Tennessee State University sculptor Jim Gibson. He spent his senior year in France, studied art history, and earned a degree in English. After a year in Rome learning bronze casting as an assistant to New York City artist Milton Hebald, LeQuire entered the University of North Carolina at Greensboro, where he earned a Master of Fine Arts degree.

== Career ==
LeQuire specializes in work of great scale, usually large public commissions. His most famous work is the replica of Phidias' Athena Parthenos that stands in the naos of the full-scale reconstruction of the Acropolis Parthenon in Nashville's Centennial Park. This statue, cast in a composite of gypsum and fiberglass on a steel and aluminum armature, is currently the largest piece of indoor sculpture in the Western World, standing almost 42 feet (13 m) tall. LeQuire received the commission for the work in 1982, and it was unveiled in 1990 in a stark, white finish. In 2002, LeQuire oversaw a polychroming and gilding process that brought the statue to an appearance close to what ancient Greek visitors may have seen at the original Parthenon.

In 1997 LeQuire created a sculptural group of life-size portraits of Tennessee women's suffrage activists Elizabeth Avery Meriwether, Anne Dallas Dudley, and Lizzie Crozier French. The sculpture is on display in Market Square in downtown Knoxville, Tennessee and is known as the Tennessee Woman Suffrage Memorial. LeQuire also created a large bronze relief for the Tennessee State Capitol in Nashville dedicated to the Women's Rights Movement and commemorating passage of the Nineteenth Amendment to the U.S. Constitution in 1920—Tennessee was the 36th state to ratify the Nineteenth Amendment, thus making it part of the U.S. Constitution.

Another large-scale work is Musica, a bronze statue grouping unveiled in 2003 that sits in a grassy knoll at the center of Buddy Killen Circle, a roundabout where Division Street meets 17th Avenue South in the Music Row area of Nashville. Musica is over 40 feet (12 m) tall, and consists of nine colossal nude figures, male and female, dancing in a circle. It is the largest bronze figure group in the United States.

LeQuire is also a portrait sculptor.

Other works by LeQuire include:

- Life-size bronze sculptures at Blair School of Music and near Kirkland Hall at Vanderbilt University.
- A heroic bronze of Timothy Demonbreun, French fur trapper and an early Nashville inhabitant, was completed in 1996 and now stands on the west bank of the Cumberland River.
- Tennessee's Vietnam Veteran's Memorial, a well-composed grouping of three figures in action, is located on War Memorial Plaza, a public plaza and building that houses the Tennessee General Assembly.
- 24 bronze reliefs of Tennessee scenes and wildlife are displayed on the exterior doors of the downtown Nashville Public Library, designed by architect Robert Stern. LeQuire also has two portrait busts in the library's Grand Reading Room.
- A life-size statue of Jack Daniel, located at the distillery in Lynchburg, TN.
- The Tennessee Woman Suffrage Monument, a monument in Centennial Park in Nashville, featuring depictions of Carrie Chapman Catt, Anne Dallas Dudley, Abby Crawford Milton, Juno Frankie Pierce, and Sue Shelton White.
- Statue of Sam Davis

LeQuire was a Tennessee Arts Commission Fellow in 1986, and received a Tennessee Governor's Citation in 1987. In 1990 he was awarded an American Institute of Architects Design Award for Athena Parthenos.
