= Centennial Park (Nashville) =

City park in Nashville, Tennessee, US

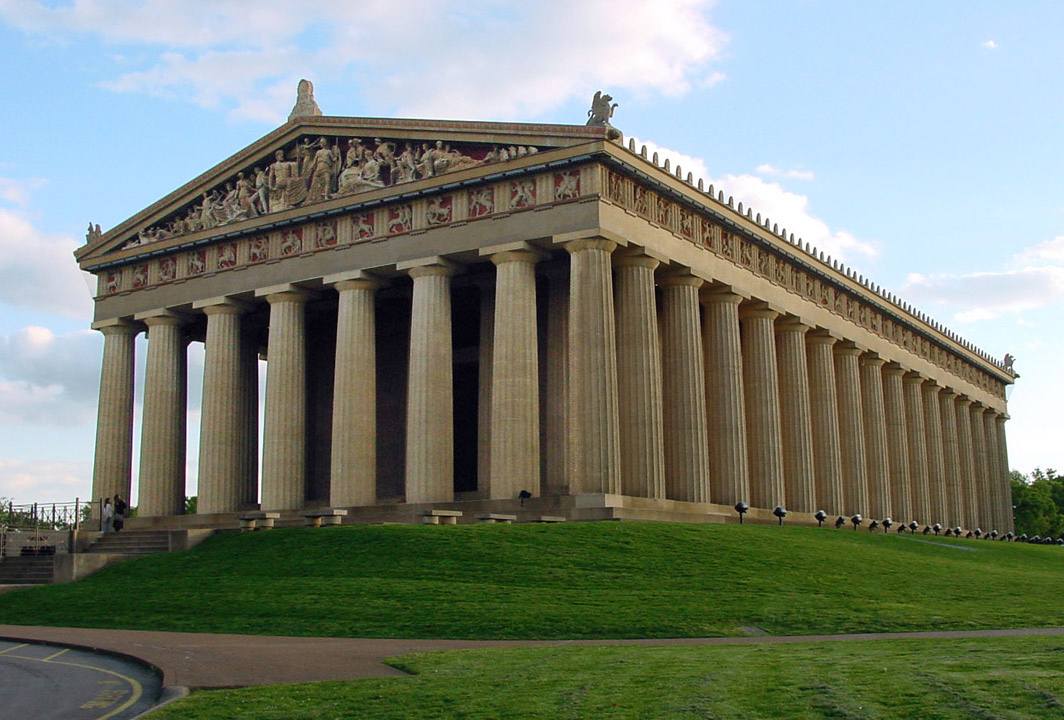
- The Parthenon is the centerpiece of the park.
- Interactive map of Centennial Park
- Type: Public park
- Location: Nashville, Tennessee, United States
- Coordinates: 36.149°N 86.812°W
- Area: 132-acre (0.53 km^{2})
- Created: 1903
- Operator: Metropolitan Nashville Department of Parks and Recreation

Centennial Park is a large urban park located approximately two miles (three km) west of downtown Nashville, Tennessee, United States, across West End Avenue (U.S. Highway 70S) from the campus of Vanderbilt University. The 21st-century headquarters campus of the Hospital Corporation of America was developed adjacent to the park.

Cultivated as farmland by some of the earliest families in Nashville, the territory became controlled by the state and used as a park after the American Civil War. In the last decade, it was used as a racetrack. It was redeveloped as the site of the Tennessee Centennial and International Exposition in 1897. Afterward most of the temporary exhibit structures were removed, but the replica of the Parthenon remained. Centennial Park was opened in 1903. Due to the popularity of the Parthenon, it was rebuilt in steel and concrete between 1925 and 1931.

== History ==
The 132-acre (0.53 km^{2}) park was originally farmland that had belonged to John Cockrill and his wife, Anne Robertson Johnson Cockrill (1757–1821), the sister of General James Robertson. She and her family came from Wake County, North Carolina to Fort Nashborough (now Nashville) in the Donelson Flotilla, led by John Donelson. (His daughter Rachel married Andrew Jackson.) Anne Cockrill was the first woman to be given a land grant in Tennessee. Their son Mark R. Cockrill became known as the "Wool King of the World", as he had a large sheep herd in Nashville. He owned up to 300 slaves prior to the Civil War, with most of them assigned to his Mississippi cotton plantation. Cockrill loaned gold and wool to the Confederate States Army during the Civil War. After the Union Army occupied Tennessee, he was arrested and jailed for his Confederate support.

Some of the land was part of the Burlington plantation established by Joseph T. Elliston, who served as the fourth mayor of Nashville from 1814 to 1817. It was later owned by his son, William R. Elliston, a Whig politician. The Ellistons were slaveholders, and their plantation extended into what are now part of the campus of Vanderbilt University and West End Park. Their mansion, on modern-day Elliston Place, was torn down in the 1930s.

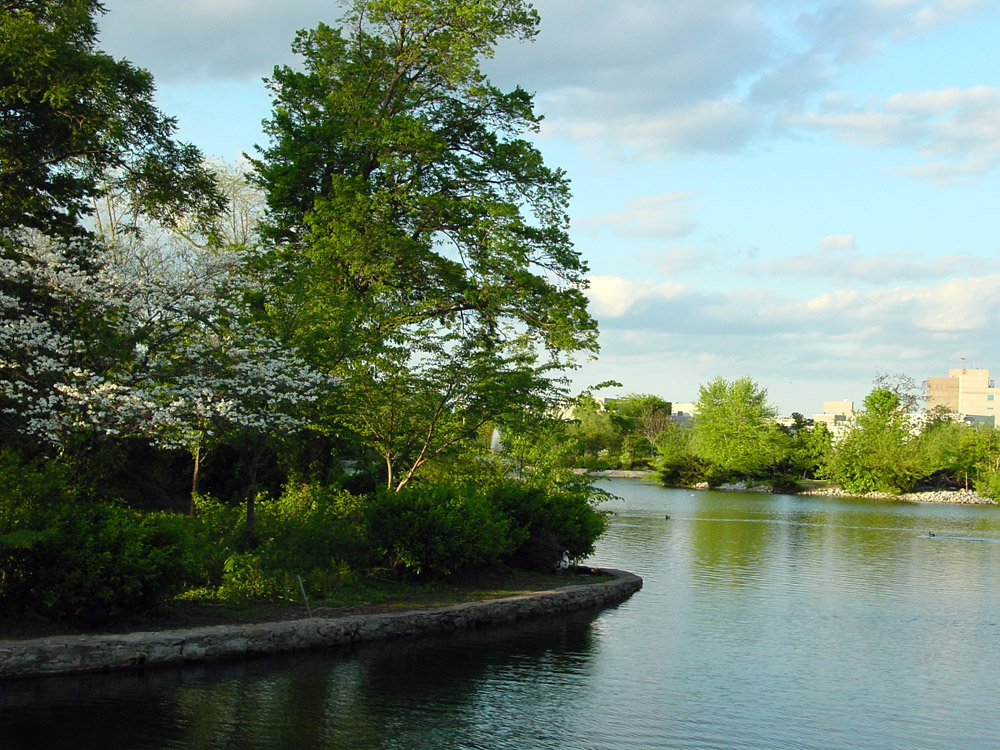
Lake Watauga is a small artificial lake in Centennial Park.

After the Civil War, this land was adapted for the state fairgrounds. From 1884 to 1895, more of the site was devoted to a racetrack and was known as West Side Park. In 1897, it was developed as the site of the Tennessee Centennial and International Exposition and was renamed as Centennial Park. In preparation for the exposition, the area was landscaped and new, temporary buildings were constructed for exhibit space. An artificial lake, Lake Watauga, was developed in the park, as were sunken gardens and a bandshell for music performances. This lake was named for an early pioneer settlement along the Watauga River in northeast Tennessee at present day Elizabethton that was the origin of a number of early settlers of Nashville.

=== The Parthenon ===
A replica of the Parthenon was also built to serve as the Exposition's Fine Arts building, and to honor Nashville's status as "The Athens of the South". It was designed by William Crawford Smith.

As was common with such expositions, afterward most of the temporary buildings and exhibits were dismantled. Lake Watauga, the gardens, bandshell and the Parthenon were the most prominent features remaining from the Exposition when the park was officially dedicated in May 1903. Consistent with Jim Crow laws, African Americans were prohibited from using Centennial Park, as they had been excluded from its previous manifestations as parks.

By the 1920s, the plaster exterior of the Parthenon replica had begun to deteriorate.

In 1909, the Confederate Private Monument, designed by George Julian Zolnay, was dedicated in the park. The United Daughters of the Confederacy (UDC) had helped raise money to commission the monument.

Centennial Park became an important recreation site for whites of Nashville. As African-American activism increased for renewed civil rights, the park became a site of conflicts. On July 18, 1961, six African Americans were turned away when they tried to use the public swimming pool in the park, which, was, of course, supported by their tax dollars. The next day, all Nashville public pools were closed under the pretext of "financial reasons". It was not until after passage in 1964 of a national civil rights law ending discrimination that African Americans were allowed to use the park. In 1972, the pool was redeveloped as an arts center.

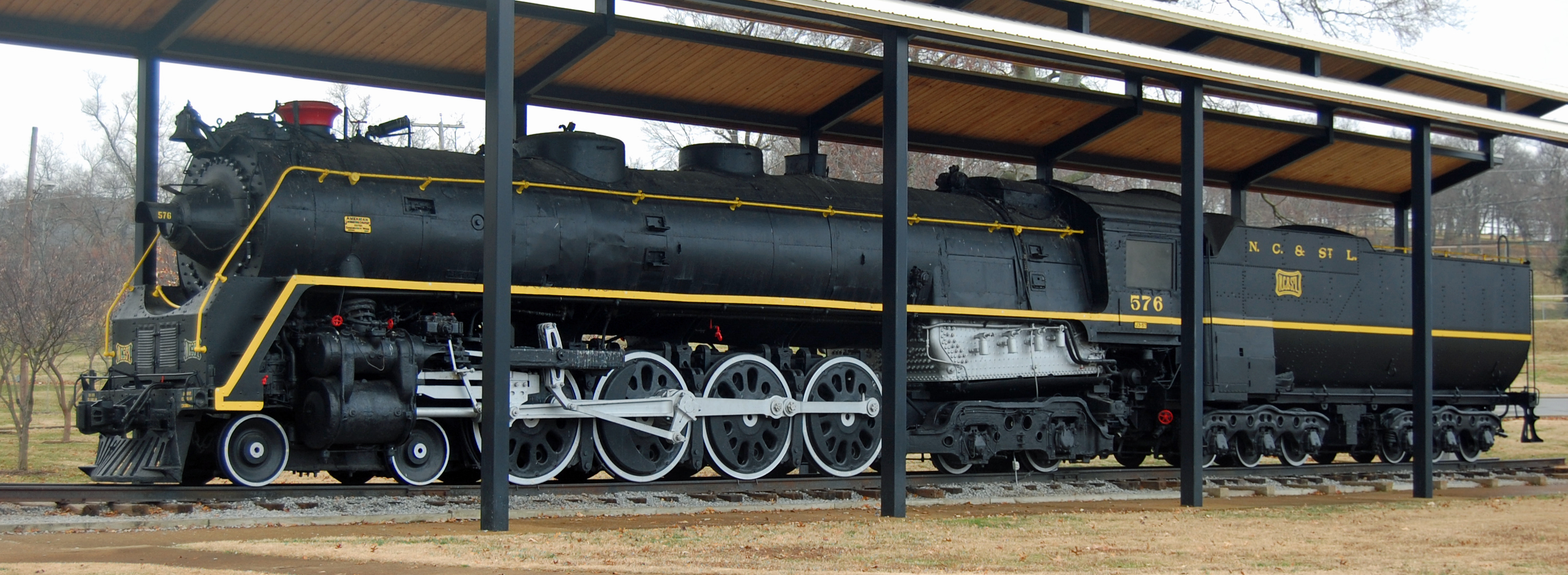
Steam engine 576, which has since moved out of the park

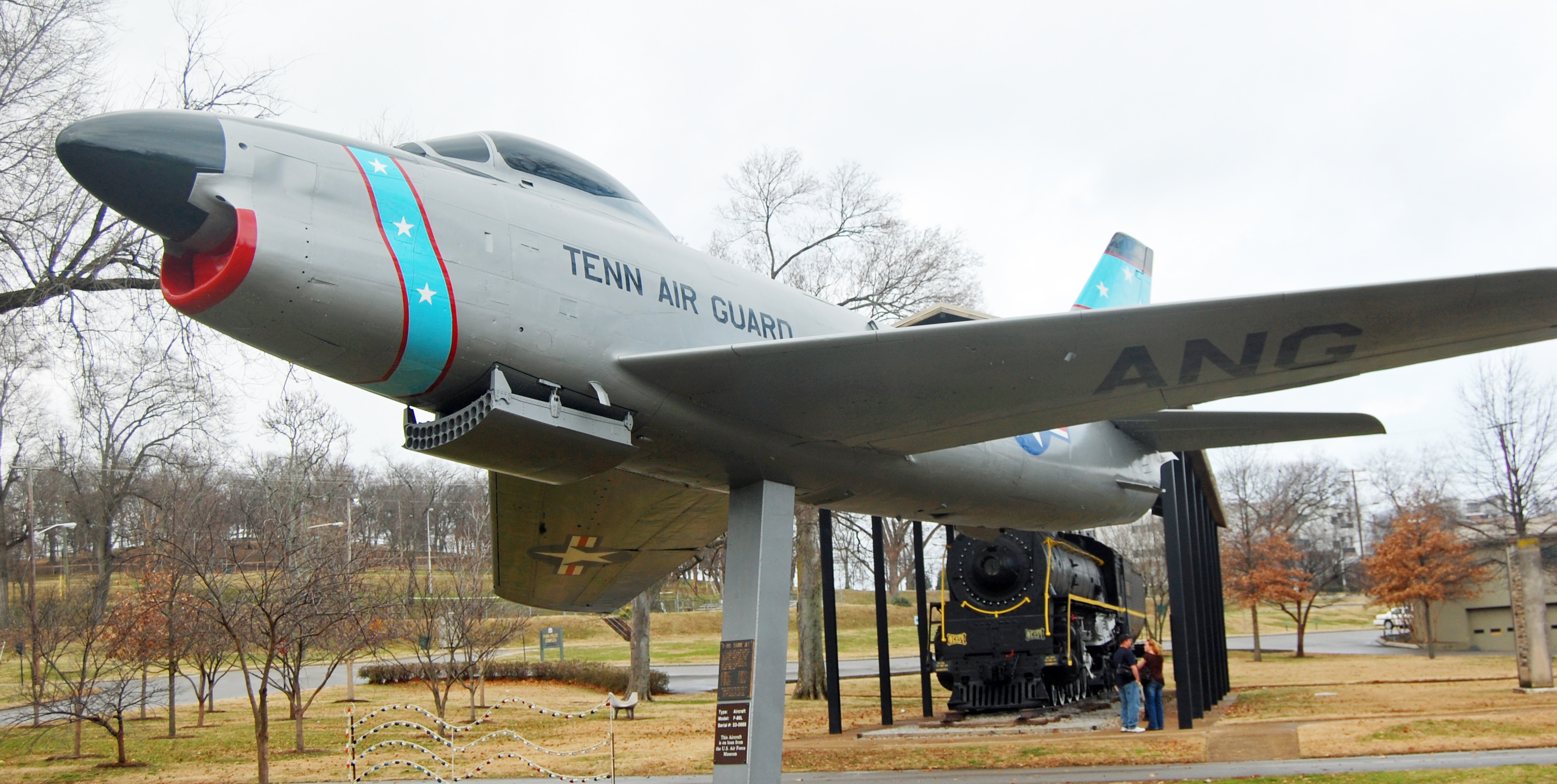
F-86L Sabre Jet

From 1954 to 1967, the Parthenon was the backdrop for an enormous nativity scene sponsored by Harveys department store. (This has since gone out of business.) The scene was approximately 280 feet (85 m) long, 75 feet (23 m) deep and was flooded with colorful lights. However, by 1968, it was sold to a Cincinnati shopping center. According to the Nashville Banner, the nativity scene was shown only two Christmas seasons in Cincinnati before it collapsed and was discarded.

In the 1960s, the park was the site of Sunday afternoon concerts; Pat Boone was among the early performers in this series. In 1975, Robert Altman shot the climactic scene of his film Nashville in the park.

In 1990, a statue of Pallas Athena, designed by Nashville sculptor Alan LeQuire, was added to the art gallery inside the Parthenon. It is dedicated to the women's suffrage movement.

By the late 20th century, the park had many mature shade trees. The 1998 Nashville tornado outbreak damaged or destroyed most of them, a loss that would take generations to replace. A Vanderbilt ROTC cadet died in the park during the storm; he was the only fatality.

On November 11, 2005, Centennial Park became Nashville's first wireless internet park by offering free Wi-Fi internet access to park patrons. The park's bandshell was the site of the annual "Shakespeare in the Park" presented by the Nashville Shakespeare Festival for thirty years until its move to Nashville's oneC1TY in 2019.

In 2012, workers found the source of the spring that was a major feature during Anne Robertson Johnson Cockrill's ownership of the land. For 100 years, it had been capped and piped to the sewer, with a flow of more than 100 gallons of water per minute. What is now called Cockrill Springs is a new natural feature of the park.

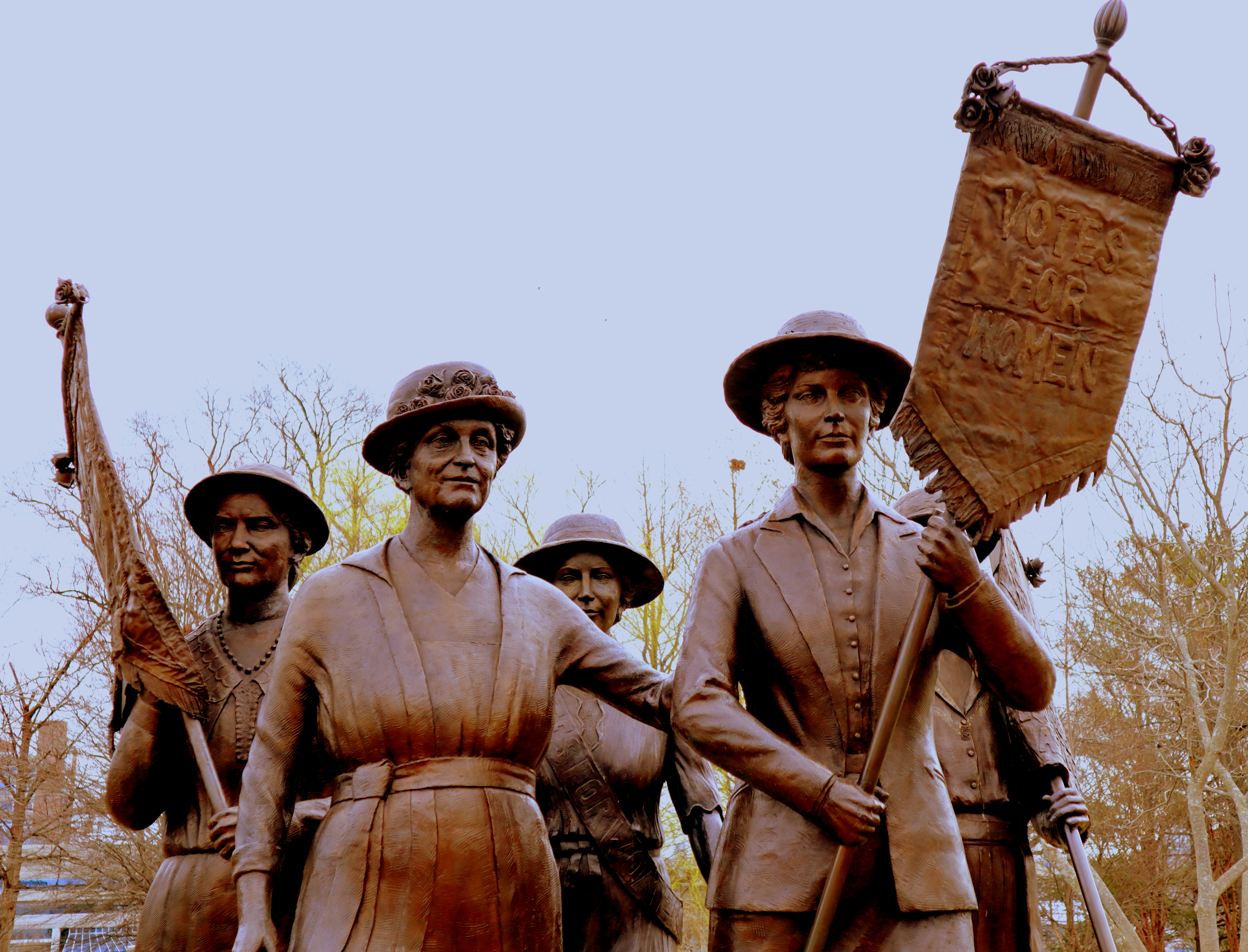
Tennessee Woman Suffrage Monument

On August 26, 2016, as part of Women's Equality Day, the Tennessee Woman Suffrage Monument by Alan LeQuire was unveiled in the park. It features depictions of Carrie Chapman Catt, Anne Dallas Dudley, Abby Crawford Milton, Juno Frankie Pierce, and Sue Shelton White, local activists for women's suffrage.

The park also contains a recreation center. It is also the site of the administrative offices of the city's Department of Parks and Recreation, but these area being relocated to the East Bank of the Cumberland River and the offices of the former Nashville Bridge Company.

== In popular culture ==
The singer-songwriter Taylor Swift lived in Nashville during the beginning of her music career. In her song Invisible String, Centennial Park is mentioned in the opening line. When she returned in 2023 for The Eras Tour, a bench dedicated to her was installed in the park.
