= Anne Dallas Dudley =

American women's suffrage activist

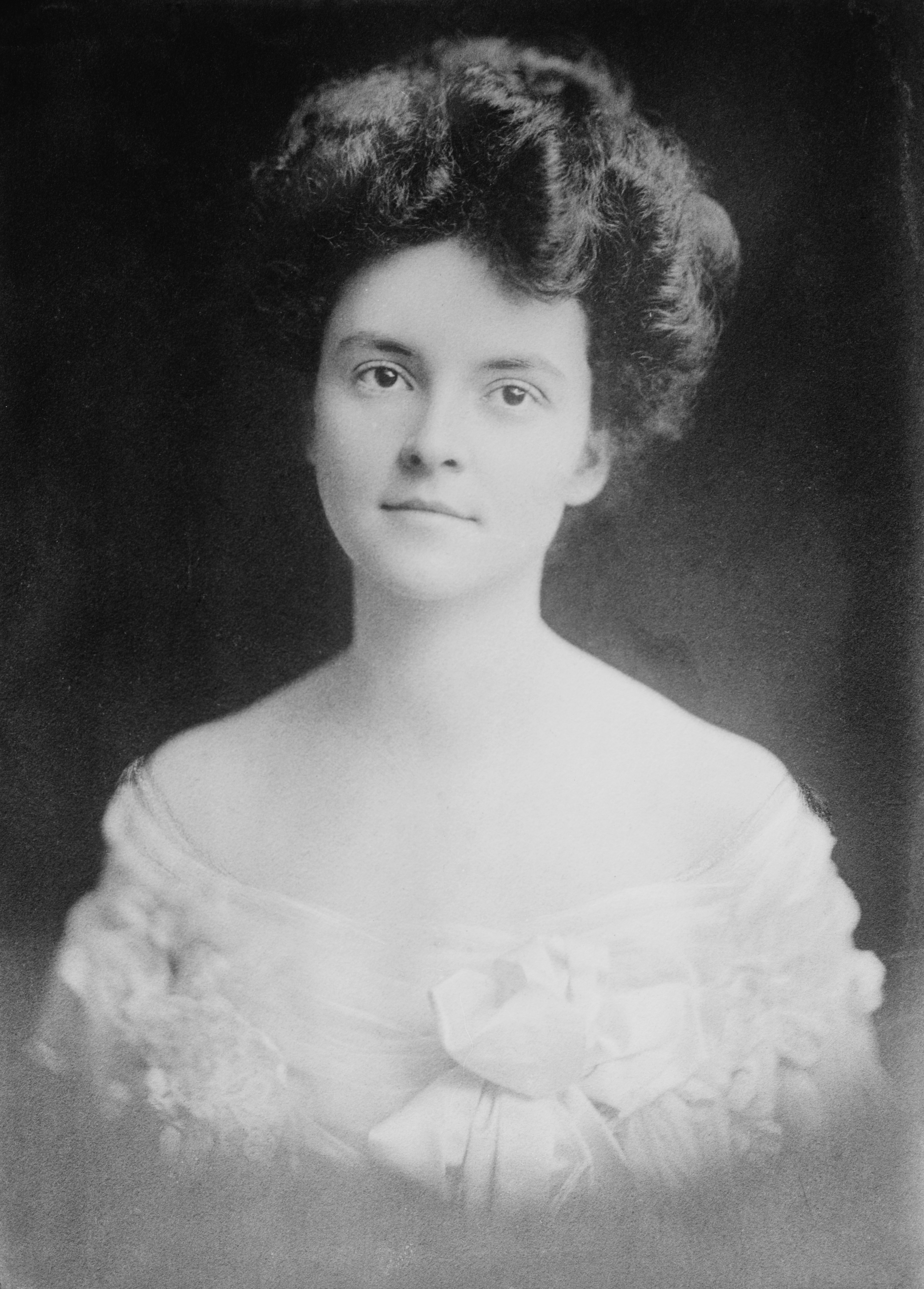
- Dudley, c. 1900
- Born: Annie Willis Dallas; November 13, 1876; Nashville, Tennessee, U.S.
- Died: September 13, 1955 (aged 78); Belle Meade, Tennessee, U.S.
- Resting place: Mount Olivet Cemetery, Nashville, Tennessee, U.S.
- Known for: Women's suffrage activist
- Spouse: Guilford Dudley Sr. (m. 1902; died 1945)
- Children: 3, including Guilford Jr.

Anne Dallas Dudley (born Annie Willis Dallas; November 13, 1876 – September 13, 1955) was an American activist in the women's suffrage movement. She was a national and state leader in the fight for women's suffrage who worked to secure the ratification of the 19th Amendment in Tennessee.

After founding the Nashville Equal Suffrage League and serving as its president, Dudley moved up through the ranks of the movement, serving as President of the Tennessee Equal Suffrage Association and then as Vice President of the National American Woman Suffrage Association, where she helped lead efforts to get the Nineteenth Amendment to the US Constitution ratified, giving women the right to vote nationwide. She is especially noted for her successful efforts to get the Nineteenth Amendment ratified in her home state of Tennessee, the final state necessary to bring the amendment into force.

== Early life and family ==
She was born Annie Willis Dallas in Nashville, Tennessee, in 1876 to an upper-class family. Her father, Trevanion B. Dallas, had moved to Nashville in 1869 and established himself as an entrepreneur in the textile industry. Her grandfather, Alexander J. Dallas, had been a commodore in the U.S. Navy, while his brother, George M. Dallas, served as Vice President of the United States under James K. Polk.

Annie Dallas was educated at Ward's Seminary and Price's College for Young Ladies, both in Nashville. In 1902, in a quiet ceremony at Christ Church Cathedral, she married Guilford Dudley (1854–1945), a banker and insurance broker. Together they had three children, Ida Dallas Dudley (1903–1904), who died in infancy, Trevania Dallas Dudley (1905–1924), and Guilford Dudley Jr. (1907–2002).

== Women's suffrage movement ==
A few years after being married, Anne Dallas Dudley became involved in the temperance movement as a supporter of alcohol prohibition. Through her work in the temperance movement and her association with friends such as Maria Daviess and Ida Clyde Clark, Dudley became convinced that women's place in society could only be improved if women were allowed to vote. She was not the only advocate to link the temperance movement to women's suffrage. The temperance movement required women to engage with local, state, and national political processes, and some temperance advocates, including the well-known Frances Willard, also advocated for women's suffrage, believing "that as nurturers of children and as moral guardians of the home, women should be more involved in public policy and politics." At the time, however, a majority of men and women opposed the idea of women participating in the political process.

"I have never yet met a man or woman who denied that taxation without representation is tyranny. I have never yet seen one who was such a traitor to our form of government that he did not believe that the government rests upon the consent of the governed. This is a government of, for, and by the people, and only the law denies that women are people."

— Anne Dallas Dudley, 1913

In September 1911, Dudley, Daviess, Clark, and several other women (Note: The initial members of the Nashville Equal Suffrage League included: Mrs. Guilford Dudley, Mrs. Blair Smith, Mrs. Willoughby Williams, Mrs. Ida Clyde Clarke, Mrs. C. T. Hixon, Mrs. E. T. Page, Miss Amelia Terrett, Miss Maria Thompson Daviess, Miss Mary Louise Baxter, Mrs. Yarbrough, and Mrs. T. G. Settle.) met in the back parlor of the Tulane Hotel and founded the Nashville Equal Suffrage League, an organization dedicated to building local support for women's suffrage while "quietly and earnestly avoiding militant methods". Dudley was selected as the organization's first president. During her presidency, the league organized giant May Day suffrage parades, usually led by Dudley and her children. Dudley also helped bring the National Suffrage Convention to Nashville in 1914. At the time, it was one of the largest conventions ever held in the city.

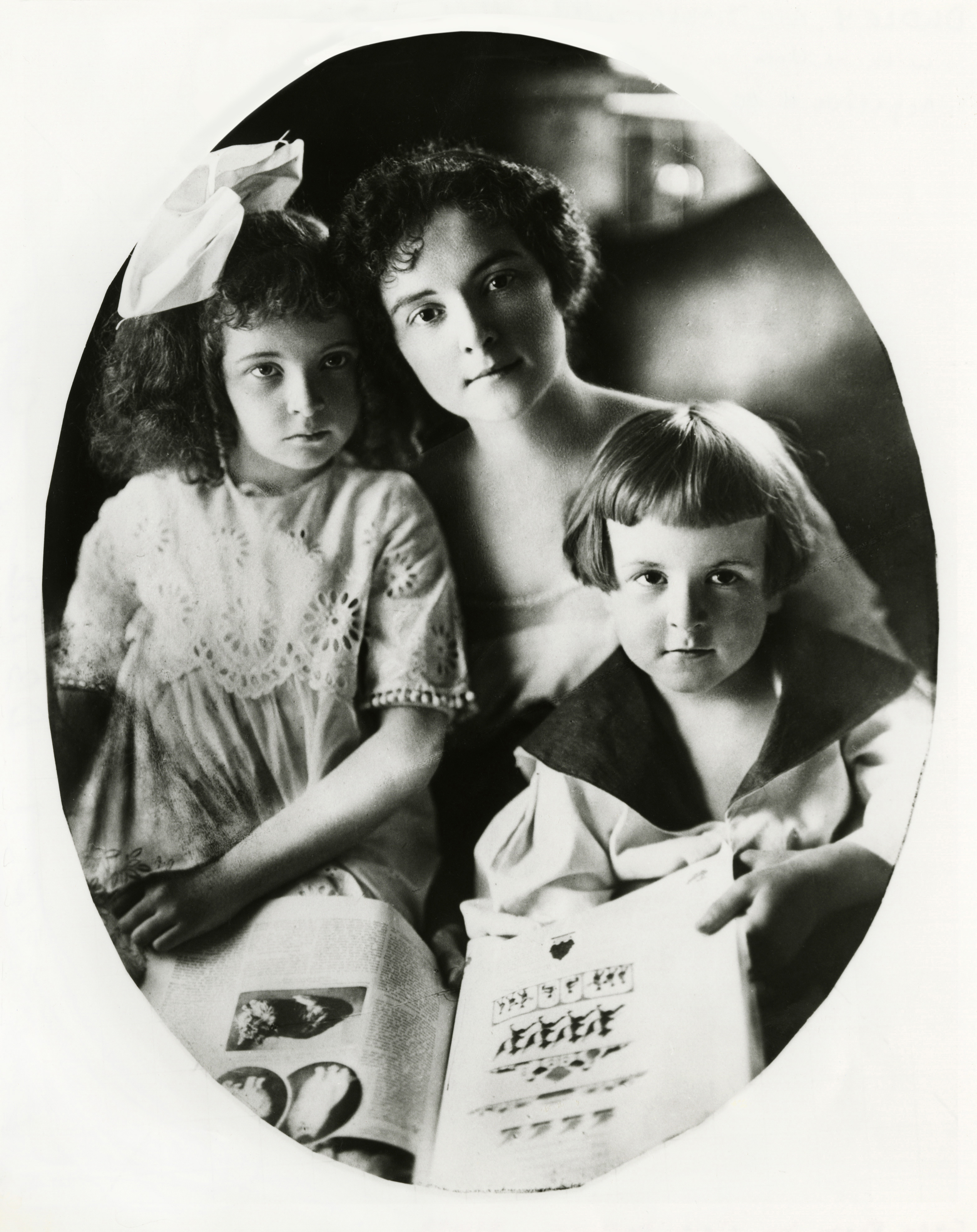
This photograph of Dudley with her children was widely circulated with suffrage publicity materials to counteract stereotypes of suffragists as mannish radicals.

After serving as president of the local league for four years, Dudley was elected to head the Tennessee Equal Suffrage Association in 1915. During this time she helped to introduce and lobby for a suffrage amendment to the state constitution. Although the amendment was defeated, a later measure to give women the right to vote in presidential and municipal elections was eventually passed by the state legislature in 1919.

In 1917, Dudley became Vice President of the National American Woman Suffrage Association, where she contributed to advancing legislation on the issue of women's suffrage. In 1920, Dudley, along with Catherine Talty Kenny and Abby Crawford Milton, led the campaign in Tennessee to approve ratification of the Nineteenth Amendment to the US Constitution. On August 18, Tennessee became the 36th and deciding state to ratify the amendment, thereby giving women the right to vote throughout the country.

== Later life ==
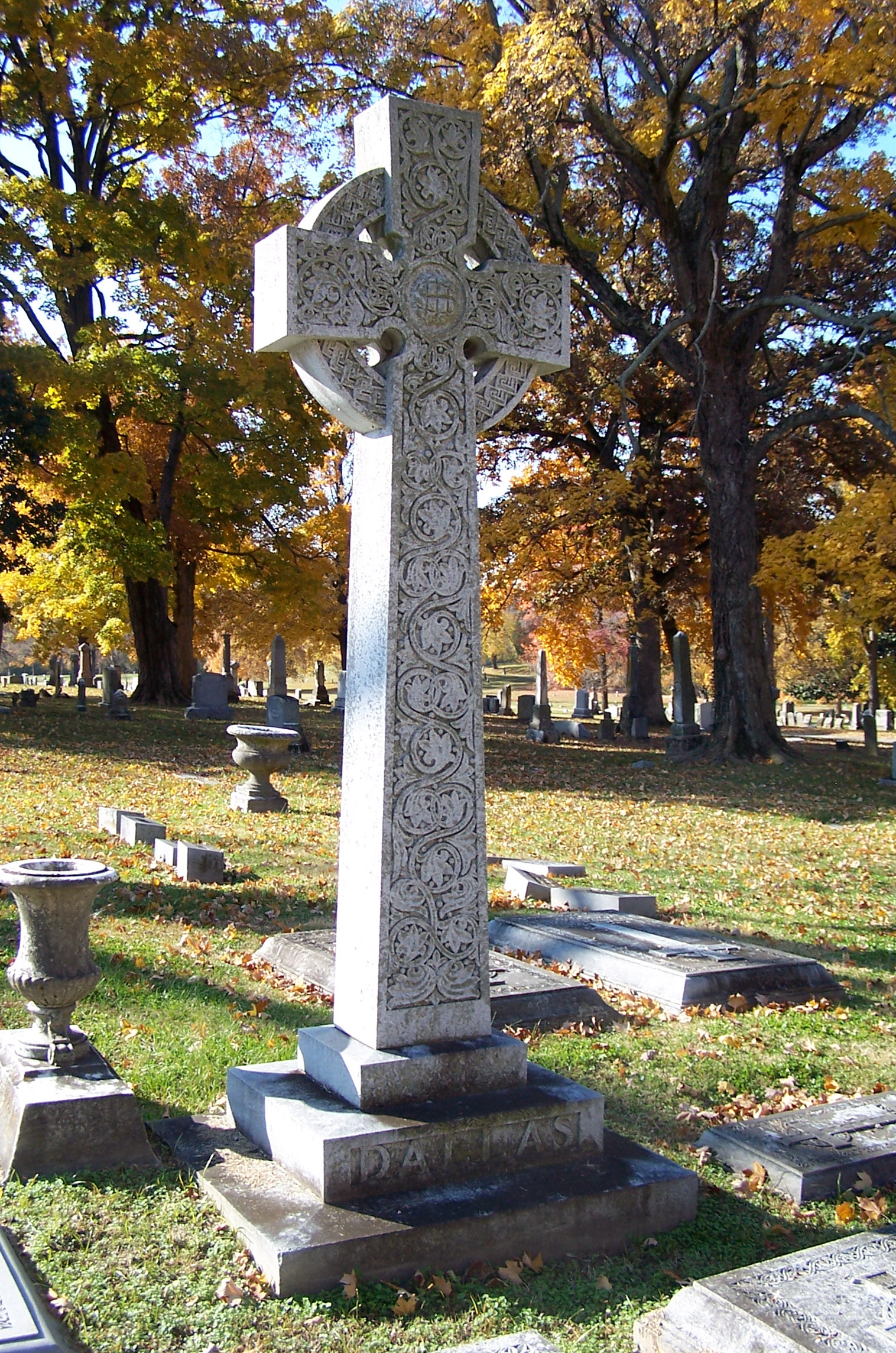
A Celtic cross stands in the center of the Dallas family burial lot.

Following the success of the suffrage campaign, Dudley became the first woman associate chairman of the Tennessee Democratic Committee. She was also selected as the first female delegate-at-large to the Democratic National Convention in 1920. Dudley's involvement in politics declined significantly in subsequent years, with her efforts being focused on civic and charitable causes during the remainder of her life. She was an active worker for the American Red Cross during World War II and later served as board chairman of the Association for the Preservation of Tennessee Antiquities.

Dudley died unexpectedly on September 13, 1955, of a coronary occlusion at her home in Belle Meade, Tennessee. She was 78 years old. She is buried with her family at Mount Olivet Cemetery in Nashville.

== Legacy ==
Dudley's legacy has been honored in numerous ways. She is one of three women featured in the Tennessee Woman Suffrage Memorial in Knoxville, Tennessee, along with Lizzie Crozier French of Knoxville and Elizabeth Avery Meriwether of Memphis. She is featured along with ten other prominent Tennesseans in The Pride of Tennessee, the official Tennessee State Bicentennial Portrait which hangs in the Tennessee State Capitol. There is also a historical marker, placed by the Tennessee Historical Commission, in Nashville's Centennial Park dedicated to her. Dudley was inducted into the National Women's Hall of Fame in 1995.

An apartment building completed in 2015 on Elliston Place in Nashville is named "The Dallas" in honor of her.

On August 26, 2016, as part of Women's Equality Day, a monument by Alan LeQuire was unveiled in Centennial Park in Nashville, featuring depictions of Dudley, Carrie Chapman Catt, Abby Crawford Milton, Juno Frankie Pierce, and Sue Shelton White.

In 2017, Capitol Boulevard in downtown Nashville was renamed Anne Dallas Dudley Boulevard.

== See also ==
- List of suffragists and suffragettes
