= Statue of Sam Davis (Montgomery Bell Academy) =

Statue of Confederate soldier at Montgomery Bell Academy in Nashville, Tennessee

- Artist: Alan LeQuire
- Year: 1999
- Medium: Bronze
- Subject: Sam Davis
- Location: Nashville, Tennessee, U.S.; 36.12856°N 86.8366°W
- Owner: Montgomery Bell Academy

A bronze statue of the Confederate soldier Sam Davis was installed in 1999 at Nashville, Tennessee's Montgomery Bell Academy, in the United States. The sculpture was designed by the local artist Alan LeQuire. Davis had been an student at the Western Military Institute, a predecessor of the Montgomery Bell Academy.

== History ==
According to the school's headmaster, the statue was originally installed "because of Sam Davis's pre-Civil War connection to one of MBA's predecessor schools and the attributes of loyalty and friendship associated with his life and story".

=== Removal ===
The statue was removed in 2020 following the murder of George Floyd and subsequent protests. The school's headmaster said, "MBA understands the concerns about the Sam Davis statue, and we will remove the statue from the campus within the week... We recognize the ways in which this story and Sam Davis's association with the Confederacy have become increasingly troubling, particularly as perspectives on the past have shifted. We strive to be an inclusive community, not one that either is or is perceived as racist or supportive of values that demean or marginalize others. In that spirit and with that conviction, we will remove the statue."

In April 2022, officials submitted a petition to remove a different statue of Sam Davis from Nashville's Centennial Park, pending approval by the Tennessee Historical Commission.

== See also ==
- List of monuments and memorials removed during the George Floyd protests
