= Lizzie Crozier French =

American women's rights activist (1851–1926)

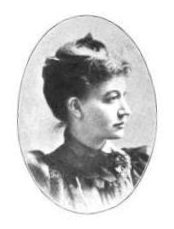
- Photograph from the History of the Woman's Club Movement in America (1898)
- Born: Margaret Elizabeth Crozier; May 7, 1851; Knoxville, Tennessee, USA
- Died: May 14, 1926 (aged 75); Washington, D.C., USA
- Resting place: Old Gray Cemetery; Knoxville, Tennessee, USA
- Education: Convent of the Visitation
- Occupations: Educator, activist
- Spouse: William Baxter French
- Children: William Williams French
- Parent(s): John Hervey Crozier and Mary Williams

Margaret Elizabeth Crozier French (May 7, 1851 – May 14, 1926) was an American educator, women's suffragist and social reform activist. She was one of the primary leaders in the push for women's rights in Tennessee in the early 1900s, and helped the state become the 36th state to certify the 19th Amendment to the United States Constitution, giving women the right to vote, in 1920. She also founded the Ossoli Circle, the oldest federated women's club in the South, and led efforts to bring coeducation to the University of Tennessee.

== Biography ==
=== Early life ===
Lizzie Crozier was born in Knoxville, Tennessee, in 1851, one of the five daughters of John H. Crozier and Mary Williams Crozier. Her father was a politician who had served in the Tennessee House of Representatives from 1837 to 1839, representing Knox County, and who had represented Tennessee's 3rd Congressional District in the U.S. House of Representatives from 1845 to 1849. Young Lizzie Crozier grew up in a home full of books and was educated at the Convent of the Visitation in Georgetown and later at a private Episcopal school for young women in Columbia, Tennessee.

Since John H. Crozier supported the Confederacy, the Crozier family was forced to move several times during the Civil War to evade encroaching Union forces, but returned to Knoxville in 1867. Around 1870, Lizzie Crozier starred alongside future author Frances Hodgson Burnett in a performance of She Stoops to Conquer. In 1872, she married William Baxter French, the cashier of the wholesaling giant, Cowan, McClung and Company. Her husband died just 18 months after the marriage, and she was never to marry again. The couple had one child, a son named William Williams French.

=== Early work in education ===
Fond of learning, French travelled widely to attend seminars and classes across the country. In October 1885, with the aid of her sisters, she reopened the East Tennessee Female Institute, which her grandfather had helped establish in the 1820s, but had been closed since the Civil War. She emphasized public speaking, and published A Manual of Elocution for her students in 1887. She served as the school's principal until 1890, when their lease on the building expired, and she decided to focus on political activism.

In November 1885, French initiated the founding of the Ossoli Circle, which was the first women's club in Tennessee and was to become the first club in the southern United States to join the General Federation of Women's Clubs. She was inspired to form the Ossoli Circle after having visited the Sorosis Women's Club in New York City. The Ossoli Circle is named for the early 19th-century transcendentalist and feminist Margaret Fuller Ossoli.

=== Early activism ===
French's travels to northern states exposed her to progressive feminist philosophies, and left her appalled at the state of women's rights in Tennessee, especially in regards to lack of educational opportunities. One of her first initiatives was to convince the state to allow women to attend the University of Tennessee. In 1889, she delivered an "aggressive" speech before the State Teachers' Association in support of a measure calling for coeducation at the university. In spite of the efforts of state superintendent Frank M. Smith, who derided the idea of women attending UT as "simply absurd," the measure passed, and UT began admitting women in 1892.

In 1890, French founded the Woman's Educational and Industrial Union to promote various social reforms in Knoxville. Shortly after its formation, the group convinced the city to appoint a police matron to oversee female inmates, and ensure they remained separated from male inmates. Knoxville was the first city in the South to appoint such an office. In October 1893, the group established the Mount Rest Home to care for elderly destitute women, and later gained funding for a reformatory and an industrial school.

=== Women's rights ===
In the early 1900s, the women's magazine, The Delineator, conducted a survey and analysis of states' laws regarding the rights of women, and ranked Tennessee in a tie with Louisiana for last place. French described the position of married women in the state as "nothing more or less than that of a slave," pointing out that they had no right to their own property or earnings. In a 1912 speech to the Tennessee Bar Association, she blasted the state's legal bias toward men. She urged them to "not simply alter one law concerning women here and there, but to take the whole bunch and burn it up."

In 1914, Knoxville's city commission enacted an ordinance that essentially allowed prostitutes in parts of the city to operate without fear of arrest. French assailed the commission over this ordinance, and engaged in a back-and-forth with Mayor Samuel G. Heiskell over the city's refusal to arrest men who hire prostitutes. During this period, French began publishing a magazine, The People, the purpose of which was to expose the corrupt "ring leaders" running the city. She pointed out that the journal was not a guide for "society ladies," stating, "you will not learn from these columns how to butter your bread or hold your fork."

=== Women's suffrage ===
French's suffragist activities began as early as the 1880s, when she spoke to passers-by at Knoxville's Market Square. As the suffragist movement gained momentum in the 1900s, she was elected president of the Tennessee Equal Suffrage Association, and organized a writer's club to help women write letters-to-the-editor to newspapers across the state. In 1913, she engaged in a widely publicized debate with Rogersville anti-suffragist Annie Riley Hale at the National Conservation Exposition at Knoxville's Chilhowee Park.

After Congress sent the 19th Amendment to the states for ratification in the spring of 1919, French spent much of her time in Nashville lobbying state legislators. By the time the legislature convened in August 1920 to consider the amendment, thirty-five states had ratified the amendment, leaving it one state short. French and her colleagues set up headquarters in the Maxwell House Hotel in Nashville, and after a marathon lobbying session, the state house certified the amendment on August 19, 1920, and the amendment thus became law.

=== Later life ===
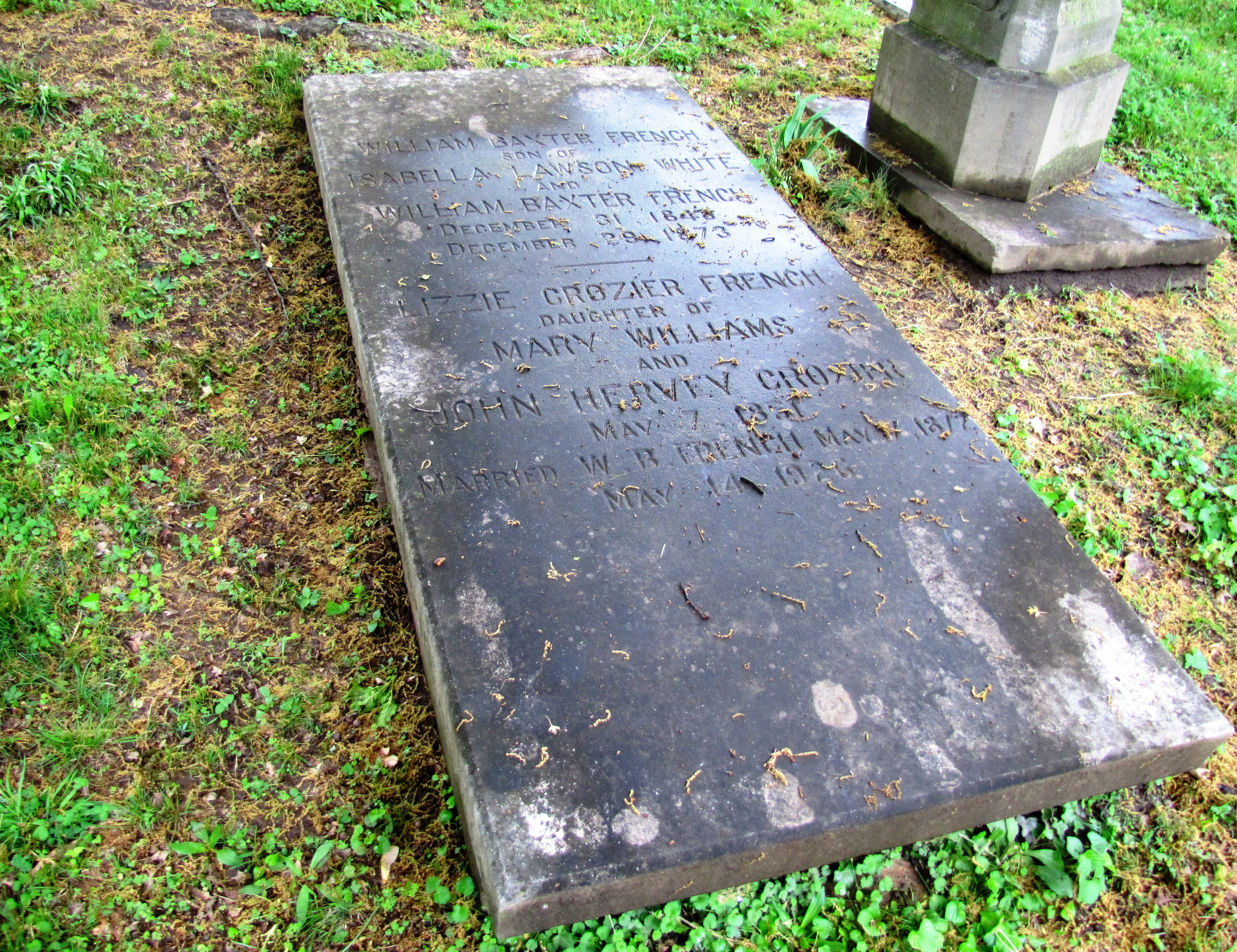
Grave of Lizzie Crozier French and husband, William, at Old Gray Cemetery

In 1923 she became the first woman to seek election to the city council in Knoxville. She campaigned as a progressive and an advocate for the "weak and unfortunate," and vowed to judge any proposed measure solely on its "righteousness." Her candidacy was unsuccessful.

Lizzie Crozier French died May 14, 1926, in Washington, D. C., after a brief illness. She was in the Washington area to attend a conference of the National Woman's Party in Baltimore and to lobby the U.S. Congress in favor of a support of a bill intended to benefit working women. She is buried in Knoxville's Old Gray Cemetery.

== Tennessee Woman Suffrage Memorial ==
Lizzie Crozier French is depicted in a life-size bronze statue on the Tennessee Woman Suffrage Memorial in Market Square in Knoxville, Tennessee, along with Anne Dallas Dudley of Nashville and Elizabeth Avery Meriwether of Memphis. The sculpture is by Alan LeQuire.

== Historic marker ==
There is a historic marker in Old Gray Cemetery honoring Lizzie Crozier French. She was honored with the marker in August 2021.

== Bust ==
A bust of Lizzie Crozier French has been placed in the East Tennessee History Museum.

== See also ==
- Mary Boyce Temple
