= Ida Clyde Clarke =

American journalist, writer and suffragist

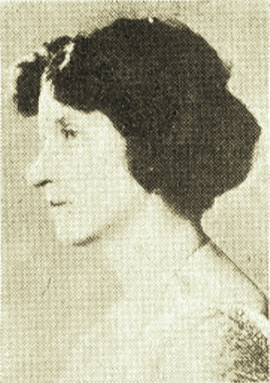
Clarke in a 1921 magazine.

Ida Clyde Clarke (nee Gallaher; March 24, 1878 in Meridian, Mississippi–1956) was an American journalist, writer and suffragist. "She was a prolific and multi-faceted writer, producing works of both fiction and non-fiction studies of community organization and feminism".

== Life ==
In 1920, she founded a monthly magazine The Independent Woman, editing it until 1921.

She was a contributing editor to Pictorial Review and founded its US$5,000 annual award for women of achievement.

In 1932, her son, Haden Clarke, was a ghostwriter engaged to write the memoirs of the aviator Jessie Miller. After a relationship ensued between Clarke and Miller, Clarke was killed by a gunshot wound to the head. The gun belonged to Miller's partner Bill Lancaster, who also admitted forging suicide notes, but Lancaster was acquitted of murder charges.

== Works ==
- All about Nashville, a complete historical guide book to the city, 1912
- Record no. 33, 1915
- American women and the world war, 1918
- The little democracy: a text-book on community organization, 1918.
- (ed.) Women of 1923, International, 1923. (Subsequent editions appeared in 1924, 1925 and 1928.)
- Uncle Sam needs a wife, 1925
- (with A. O Bowden) Tomorrow's Americans: a practical study in student self-government, 1930
- Men that wouldn't stay dead: twenty-six authentic ghost stories, 1936
