= Lee Meriwether (author) =

American lawyer and writer

Lee Meriwether (December 25, 1862 – March 12, 1966) was an American author, government official and centenarian.

Born on Christmas Day in Columbus, Mississippi, he studied in the Memphis public school system. Afterwards he took a trip to Europe and, upon his return, was asked by the United States Secretary of the Interior to write a report on labor condition on that continent, which was published in the 1886 annual report of the US Bureau of Labor's annual report. From 1886-1889 he was employed by the Department of the Interior as a special agent investigating labor conditions in the US and the Kingdom of Hawaii. In 1889 he moved to Missouri where he became a labor commissioner, while reading law at his father's law office in St. Louis. He was admitted to the Missouri Bar Association in 1892 he practiced law in St. Louis for nearly seventy years. He also wrote numerous travelogues and autobiographies. During World War I he was appointed Special Assistant to the American ambassador to France.

== Awards ==
- Croce di Cavaliere Ufficiale by the Crown of Italy 1938

== Works ==
- A tramp trip; how to see Europe on fifty cents a day New York, Harper & Bros. 1886
- The tramp at home New York, Harper & Bros 1889
- Address [on] Jefferson Davis Birmingham, Ala. : [s.n.], 1908
- Seeing Europe by Automobile, 1911
- Carrying civilization to Ethiopia: benefits the whole world as well as Italy and Ethiopia [Address given to the Italian Club of St. Louis, May 7, 1938. St Louis, MO: A. Boggiano, 1938.
- America at the fork of the road: an address to the St. Louis Rotary Club May 17, 1951 [St. Louis, MO Jeffersonians, 1951
- Lee Meriwether again addresses Rotary Club. [St. Louis, Mo.? : s.n., 1952
- I knew Jefferson Davis in 1867, and was his house guest at Beauvoir in 1887 [St. Louis, Mo. : L. Meriwether, 1958
- Let us preserve the purity of the white race and keep the records of history straight: an address [St. Louis, Mo. : L. Meriwether, 1958
- Why did the South secede in 1860? [St. Louis, Mo. : The Author?, 1964
