= Abby Crawford Milton =

American suffragist and supercentenarian (1881–1991)

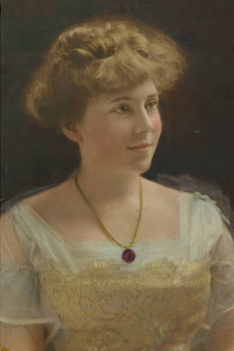
- Mrs. George Fort Milton, Pres. Tenn. W.S.A.
- Born: Abby Crawford; February 6, 1881; Milledgeville, Georgia, US
- Died: May 2, 1991 (aged 110); Clearwater, Florida, US
- Education: Chattanooga College of Law
- Occupation: Suffragist
- Spouse: George Fort Milton (m. 1904; died 1924)

Abby Crawford Milton (Note: Sometimes spelled Abbey Crawford Milton) (6 February 1881 – 2 May 1991) was an American suffragist and supercentenarian. She was the last president of the Tennessee Equal Suffrage Association. She traveled throughout Tennessee making speeches and organizing suffrage leagues in small communities. In 1920, she, along with Anne Dallas Dudley and Catherine Talty Kenny, led the campaign in Tennessee to approve ratification of the Nineteenth Amendment to the US Constitution. On August 18, Tennessee became the 36th and deciding state to ratify the amendment, thereby giving women the right to vote throughout the country.

After the Nineteenth Amendment was ratified, Milton became the first president of the League of Women Voters of Tennessee. She also worked toward the creation of the Great Smoky Mountains National Park and attended Democratic national conventions as a delegate-at-large. In 1924 she gave the seconding nomination speech for William Gibbs McAdoo as he ran for the Democratic presidential nomination. In the late 1930s she ran as a New Deal Democrat for the Tennessee State Senate, but lost.

On August 26, 2016, as part of Women's Equality Day, a monument by Alan LeQuire was unveiled in Centennial Park in Nashville, featuring depictions of Milton, Carrie Chapman Catt, Anne Dallas Dudley, Juno Frankie Pierce, and Sue Shelton White.

== Personal life ==
Abby Crawford Milton was born in Milledgeville, Georgia to newspaper publisher Charles Peter Crawford and Anna Ripley Orme.

In 1904, Abby, married George Fort Milton Sr., an editor of the pro-suffrage Chattanooga News; this was George's second marriage. While George was busy with the newspaper, Abby went to school. She attended Chattanooga College of Law where she received her law degree but never practiced it. Together, George and Abby had three daughters; Corinne, Sarah Anna, and Frances. When George's first wife, Caroline Mounger McCall died in 1897, she left a son behind, George Fort Milton Jr. He became Abby's stepson when she married George. When George F. Milton Sr. died in 1924, Abby and stepson George took over the Chattanooga News until it was sold in the 1930s.

Later, Abby Crawford Milton moved to Clearwater, Florida where she began to write. She published "A Report of the Tennessee League of Women Voters," "The Magic Switch," poetry for children; "Caesar's Wife and Other Poems"; "Lookout Mountain"; "Flower Lore"; and "Grandma Says".

Milton died on 2 May 1991 in Clearwater, aged 110. Her grave is in Clearwater at Sylvan Abbey Memorial Park, between those of Frances Walker and Corinne Moore, two of her three daughters.

== Further reading and resources ==
- Carole Stanford Bucy, "The Thrill of History Making: Suffrage Memories of Abby Crawford Milton," Tennessee Historical Quarterly 50 (1996): 224-39.
- Excerpts from oral interview of Abby Crawford Milton on August 3, 1983 on the Tennessee Virtual Archive. Tennessee State Library and Archives.
