= Sue Shelton White =

American lawyer (1887–1943)

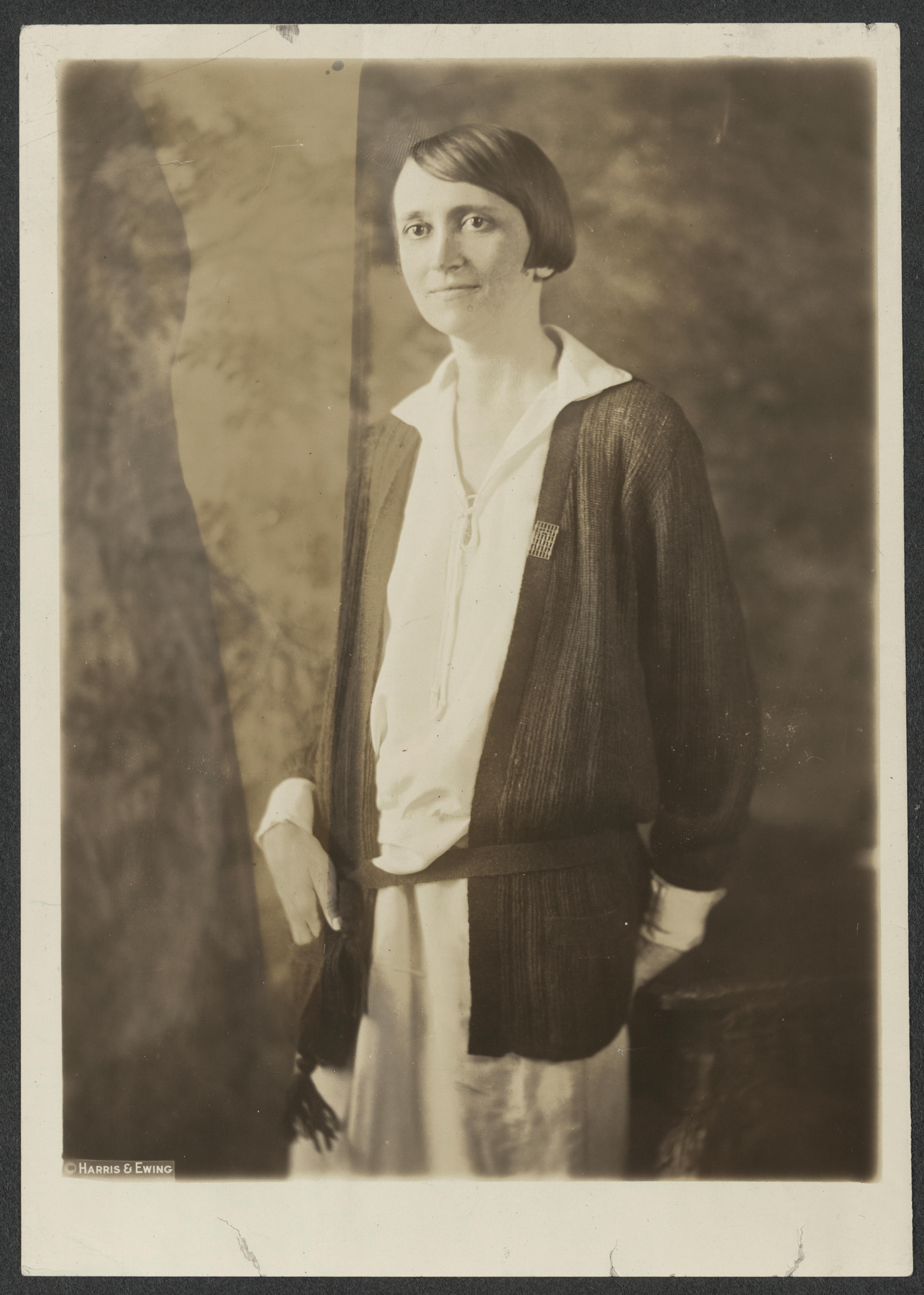
- Sue Shelton White circa 1920
- Born: May 25, 1887; Henderson, Tennessee, U.S.
- Died: May 6, 1943 (aged 55); Alexandria, Virginia, U.S.
- Education: Washington College of Law
- Occupations: Attorney, Suffragist

Sue Shelton White (May 25, 1887 – May 6, 1943), called Miss Sue, was a feminist leader originally from Henderson, Tennessee, who served as a national leader of the women's suffrage movement, member of the Silent Sentinels and editor of The Suffragist.

In 1918, White became chair of the National Woman's Party. With passage of the Nineteenth Amendment to the United States Constitution she returned home to help gain Tennessee ratification. In 1920 White returned to Washington, working as administrative secretary to U.S. Senator Kenneth McKeller, while attending Washington College of Law where she earned a law degree in 1923. She became lead counsel for the Social Security Administration.

== Background ==
Sue Shelton White was born on May 25, 1887, in Henderson, Tennessee, the fourth of six children of James Shelton White and Mary Calista (Swain) White. White's father, a lawyer and Methodist minister, died when she was nine and her mother worked to support the family, teaching piano to both white and black children, giving voice lessons, and writing for the local newspaper. When White was 14, her mother died and she went to live with her aunt, Sue White Tarver. When she was sixteen she took a teacher training course at Georgia Robertson Christian College (now Freed–Hardeman University) and the following year (1904-1905) attended West Tennessee Business College. She started her career as a stenographer and clerk for the Southern Engine and Boiler Works in Jackson, Tennessee, but was discouraged by her employers from learning the business. When her sister, Lucy White, resigned in 1907 as a court reporter for the Tennessee Supreme Court in Jackson, White took the job, which she held until 1918. She also opened her own stenography business.

== Suffragist ==
White joined the woman suffrage movement in 1912. She was originally active in the moderate Tennessee Equal Suffrage Association (an affiliate of the National American Woman Suffrage Association), and was elected recording secretary for that organization in 1913, a position she held for five years. During that time, she honed her public speaking skills, wrote newspaper articles, published convention proceedings, and organized the association's headquarters in Nashville. In 1917 she lobbied for a statewide law that would grant women the right to vote in municipal and presidential elections. In 1918, she helped to reconcile two factions of the Tennessee women's suffrage movement, creating the Tennessee Woman Suffrage Association.

White gradually concluded that Alice Paul and Lucy Burns' more radical National Woman's Party, whose speaking tour through Tennessee by Maud Younger she had helped facilitate, was advocating policies and methods which would be more effective. She joined the NWP in 1918, became chair of the Tennessee chapter, and moved to Washington, D.C., where she edited the organization's newspaper, The Suffragist.

With other members of the NWP, White drew national attention when on February 19, 1919, they held the latest of their Silent Sentinels series of demonstrations in front of the White House and burned a paper effigy of President Woodrow Wilson (which White and Mrs. Gabrielle Harris dropped into the fire). They did this to protest Wilson's lack of energy in pressuring balky Senators of his own party. White, with others, was arrested and jailed. After her release, White and others like her chartered a railroad car they called the "Prison Special," which toured the United States to keep the issue of suffrage before the public.

After Congress passed the Nineteenth Amendment on June 4, 1919, White returned home to help with the ratification effort in Tennessee. By August 1920, the amendment had been ratified by 35 states; to enter the Constitution, the amendment would need to be ratified by one more state. Eight southern states had already defeated the amendment, making Tennessee an important battleground. It was White's job to run the National Woman's Party ratification campaign in Tennessee, working collaboratively with state suffrage leaders and NAWSA to pressure the governor to call a special session to address ratification and to lobby 132 members of the legislature. She established the NWP's headquarters in downtown Nashville, organized field staff, including Anita Pollitzer, Bett Gram, and Catherine Flanagan, and regularly polled legislators. She was credited with convincing Tennessee Speaker of the House Seth Walker to support ratification, but saw that support slip away when Walker decided to lead the opposition to the amendment on the House floor. As support for the amendment waned, White announced she would reveal the names of any delegate who withdrew their support after pledging to ratify the amendment. After much political maneuvering by suffragists and anti-suffragists, Tennessee ratified the 19th Amendment by a single vote on August 18, 1920.

== After the Nineteenth Amendment ==
During her time working to pass the Nineteenth Amendment, White was also involved in several other political organizations and reform movements. During World War I, she served on the Tennessee Division of the Women's Committee of the U.S. Council of National Defense. She joined the Southern Sociological Congress to address social issues in the South and she worked to achieve state support for the blind in Tennessee, serving as executive secretary of the Tennessee Commission for the Blind in 1918. She also drafted legislation in Tennessee, including the state's first married woman's property act, a mother's pension law, and an old-age pension act.

From 1920 to 1926, White served as an administrative secretary running the Washington office of Tennessee U.S. Senator Kenneth McKeller.

In 1923, White earned a law degree from Washington College of Law. Three years later, she returned to Jackson as the city's first female attorney and to work for her own law firm, Anderson and White.

In 1928, White worked with the Midwestern division of the Democratic National Committee. At request of Eleanor Roosevelt, White also helped organize a Tennessee Business and Professional Women's League for Alfred E. Smith.

She worked in the 1932 presidential campaign of Franklin Delano Roosevelt, and from 1934 (when she moved to Washington, D.C.) held a variety of posts in the New Deal, culminating in her role as principal counsel of the Social Security Administration.

After a long bout with cancer, White died on May 6, 1943, at the Alexandria, Virginia, home she shared with Florence Armstrong, her long-term partner.

== Tributes ==
On August 26, 2016, as part of Women's Equality Day, a monument by Alan LeQuire was unveiled in Centennial Park in Nashville, featuring depictions of White, Carrie Chapman Catt, Anne Dallas Dudley, Abby Crawford Milton, and Juno Frankie Pierce.

There is a bust of White by Wanda Stanfill at the Jackson City Hall Plaza; it is part of the Tennessee Woman Suffrage Heritage Trail, and was placed as part of the centennial celebration of the 19th Amendment.

The Sue Shelton White Award is given annually "to an outstanding attorney in West Tennessee who is a community activist working to create or change legislation to improve the lives of women and children in the state of Tennessee."

== Sources ==
- "Sue Shelton White", in Adams, Katherine H. and Michael L. Keene, After the Vote Was Won: The Later Achievements of Fifteen Suffragists Jefferson, N.C.: McFarland, 2010; pp. 143–150 and passim
- Huehls, Betty Sparks. Sue Shelton White: Lady Warrior Memphis: University of Memphis Press, 2002
- Weiss, Elaine. The Woman's Hour: The Great Fight to Win the Vote. Penguin, 2018
