= Market Square, Knoxville =

- Market Square Commercial Historic District
- U.S. National Register of Historic Places
- U.S. Historic district
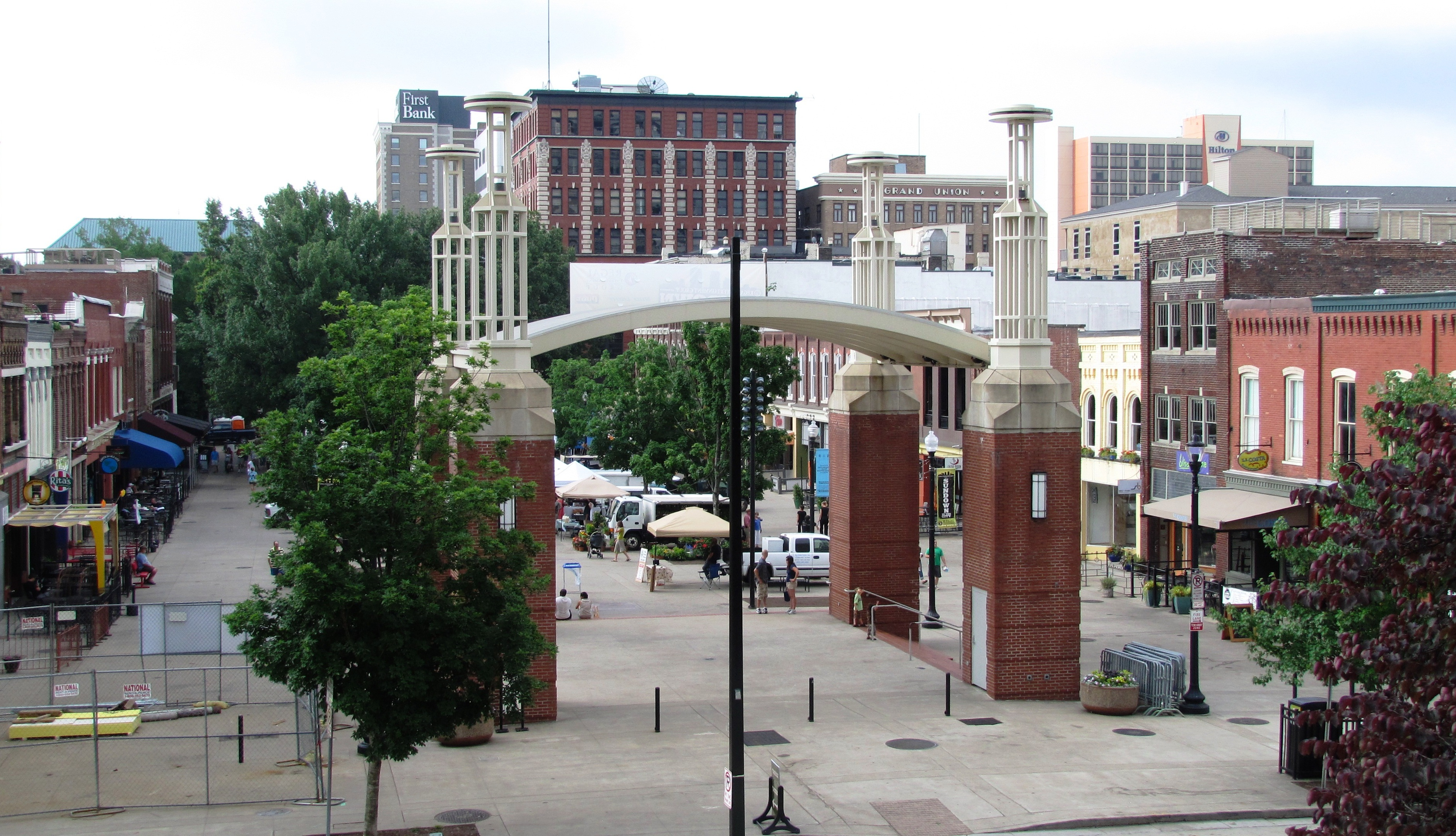
- Market Square, viewed from the north end

- Location within Tennessee Location within the United States
- Location: Market Sq. Mall, Knoxville, Tennessee
- Coordinates: 35°57′54″N 83°55′10″W
- Area: approximately 13 acres (5.3 ha)
- Built: circa 1870–1925
- Architect: multiple
- Architectural style: Classical Revival, Italianate, Vernacular Commercial
- NRHP reference No.: 84001138
- Added to NRHP: December 20, 1984

Market Square is a historic district and pedestrian mall located in downtown Knoxville, Tennessee, United States. Established in 1854 as a market place for regional farmers, the square has developed over the decades into a multipurpose venue that accommodates events ranging from concerts to political rallies, and has long provided a popular gathering place for artists, street musicians, war veterans, and activists. Along with the Market House, Market Square was home to Knoxville's City Hall from 1868 to 1924. Market Square was listed on the National Register of Historic Places in 1984.

Land for the market place was given to the city by William G. Swan and Joseph A. Mabry. Farmers from the surrounding area would bring their wagons to the Market House, where they sold their produce and wares. During the Civil War, the Union Army used the Market House as a barracks and magazine. Knoxville's post-Civil War population boom brought about continued development in Market Square, most notably the construction of Peter Kern's confections store (now The Oliver Hotel) in 1876 and Max Arnstein's seven-story department store in 1906. After the Market House damaged by fire in 1960, the remainder of the building was demolished, and Market Square was converted into a pedestrian mall.

A local newspaper once dubbed Market Square, "the most democratic place on earth," where "the rich and the poor, the white and the black, jostle each other in perfect equality." The Square has been mentioned in the works of James Agee, Cormac McCarthy, David Madden, Ken Mink and Richard Yancey, and has hosted performers ranging from Duke Ellington to Steve Winwood. Politicians and activists who have delivered speeches at the Square include Frances Willard, Booker T. Washington, William Jennings Bryan, Edward Ward Carmack, and Ronald Reagan.

== Location ==
Market Square is located at the center of Knoxville's downtown business district. It consists of an open area covering just over 1-acre (4,000 m^{2}), with storefronts on the east and west sides. The Square is bounded by Union Avenue on the south and Wall Avenue on the north. Two narrow alleys divide the backs of the Square's stores from the backs of buildings lining Gay Street to the east and Walnut Street to the west. Krutch Park lies opposite Union Avenue to the southeast, and the TVA Towers overlook the Square from the north.

Market Square is one of only two locations in Knoxville where the street addresses still follow the city's pre-1890 numbering format, the other being Emory Place north of downtown. Under this format, the street addresses are numbered starting at "1," as opposed to the newer system in use elsewhere in the city, which uses 3, 4, and 5-digit street addresses.

== History ==
=== Early years ===
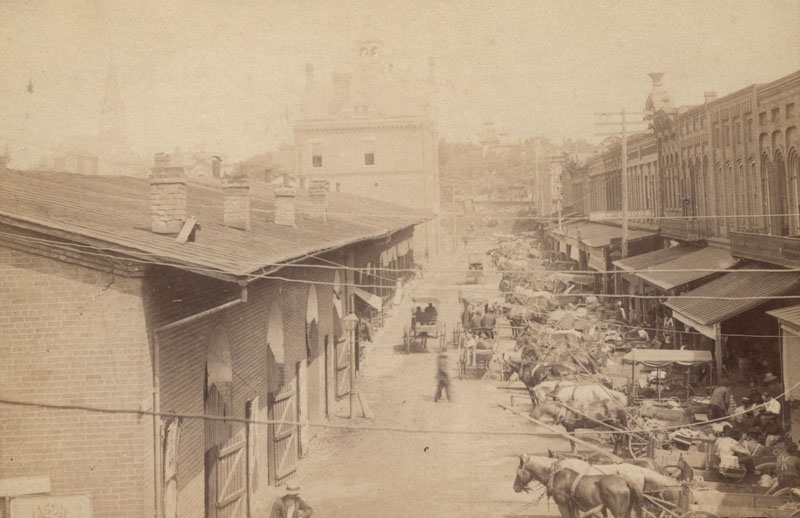
View of Market Square, with the first Market House on the left

Knoxville's first market house, built in 1816, was located on Main Street, but was sold by 1823. Over the next thirty years, farmers simply sold produce out of their wagons, usually parked along Prince (now Market Street) or Gay. In 1853, William G. Swan and Joseph A. Mabry, who had been speculating in land around Knoxville, purchased an 11-acre (4.5 ha) tract of pastureland from physician John Fouche that lay north of Union Avenue. Hoping to boost the land's value, they donated a small part of this tract— the present Market Square— to the city for the construction of a market house. The deed stipulated that the land must be used for this purpose, or ownership would revert to Swan and Mabry, or their heirs.

The original Market House was designed by the architectural firm Newman & Maxwell, and opened in January 1854. As many farmers preferred to sell produce from their wagons rather than pay the three dollars per month stall rental fee, the Market House saw scant use in its early years, even after Knoxville banned curb-side selling. A few shops sprang up on the Square, however, among them Albert Hudiburg's grocery, Patrick Tracey's saloon, a lumberyard run by John Jones, and Peter Knott's "bowling saloon."

By 1861, Market Square had become significant enough to be a designated polling station for the Ordinance of Secession vote that took place on June 8 of that year. In late 1863, when the Union Army occupied Knoxville, the Market House was converted into a barracks and ammunition magazine. Much of the stall furniture was tossed outside and ruined by the elements, and the Square's shopkeepers continuously voiced their fears about the large amounts of volatile gunpowder being stored in the Market House. For decades after the war, Confederate and Union veterans societies met regularly in buildings on Market Square.

=== Knoxville's boom period ===
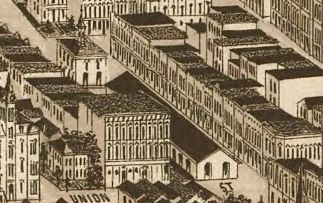
Market Square, as it appeared on an 1886 map

In 1868, Knoxville built its first permanent City Hall— a two-story building with a belltower— at the north end of Market Square. The following year, the Market House was expanded northward by about 90 feet (27 m), leaving just a short gap between it and City Hall that acted as a weighing station. During the same period, German immigrant and Confederate veteran Peter Kern opened his "ice cream saloon" at the southwest corner of the Square. Kern completed the building now known as The Oliver Hotel in 1876, with the first floor serving as a retail confectionery, the second story as an elegant ice cream shop, and the third floor providing a meeting place for the Odd Fellows.

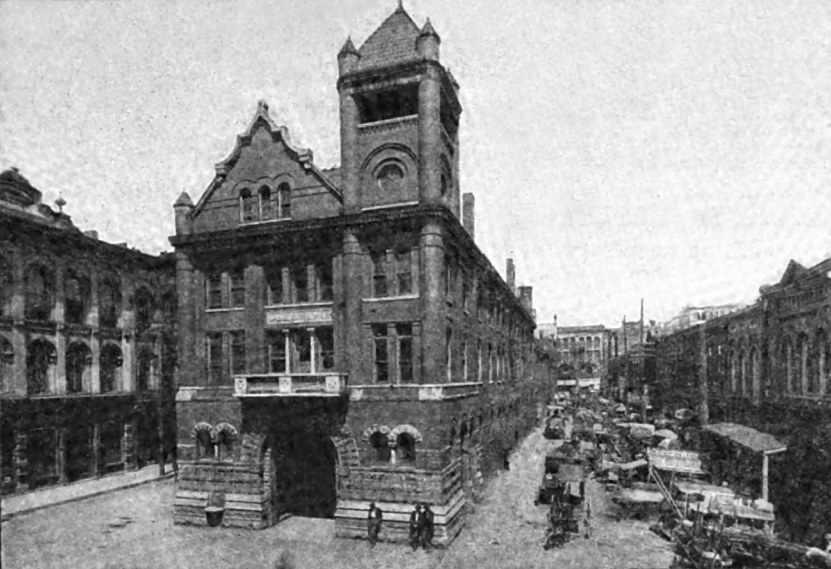
The second Market House, built in 1897

By 1876, businesses on Market Square included a millinery, a physician, a pharmacist, a dressmaker, a jeweler, and a boarding house. Within a few years, Fenton's Monumental Marble Works was operating out of a shop on the Square, carving sculptures such as those found at Old Gray Cemetery. Saloons, such as Michael Cullinan's, the Jersey Lily, and Houser & Mournan's, maintained a continued presence, although the Women's Christian Temperance Union was active on the Square by the 1880s. The Knoxville Chronicle (later the Knoxville Journal) relocated its office to Market Square in the 1870s, and it was here that publisher Adolph Ochs began his career in the newspaper industry. By the end of the 1880s, the City Hall building had proved too small and a larger and more elaborate three-story building was completed in 1888.

Sausage maker Adolph Ziegler and his partners Ignaz Fanz and Anton Metler began selling sausages out of the Ziegler Building in the 1880s, and two companies— Baum's and H. T. Hackney— began as storefronts on Market Square during the same decade. In 1897, the city built a larger Market House that included a second-story auditorium and was adjoined to the City Hall building. Market Square reached its height in 1906 when Max Arnstein built his seven-story department store overlooking the Square's southwest corner.

=== Decline and revitalization ===
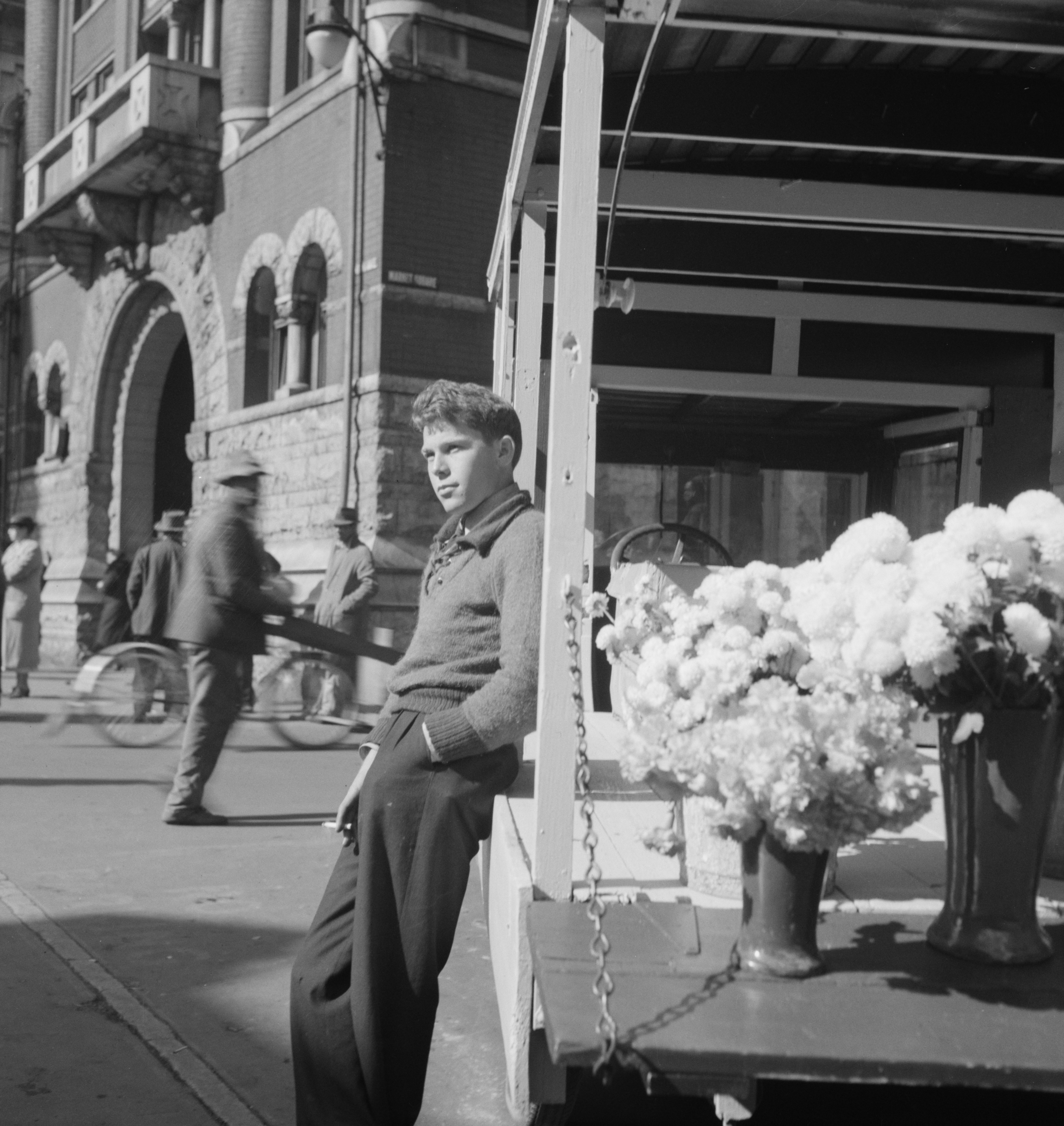
Vendor on Market Square, circa 1941, with the Market House in the background

In 1907, a citywide ordinance banning alcohol was passed, and Market Square's saloons were forced to close. With the arrival of streetcar suburbs to the north, west, south, and east of the downtown area, residents began to move away. In 1925, Kern's business was sold to investors who reorganized the company with a focus on bread making, and the Kern Building on Market Square became Coleman's drugstore. That same year, Knoxville moved its City Hall to the empty Deaf and Dumb Asylum a few blocks away. In 1927, Max Arnstein retired, and his department store closed.

In spite of these setbacks, new businesses continued moving to the Square. A local grocery store chain, the White Stores, opened a store on the Square in 1927, and regional grocer Cas Walker opened one of his cash stores on the Square in the early 1940s. Movie theaters also began appearing on the Square, most notably the Rialto in the late 1920s and the Crystal in the 1930s. During the same period, Greek immigrant John Demetrius Cavalaris opened the Golden Sun, beginning a multi-generational presence on the Square.

In the 1950s, Knoxville mayor George Dempster spearheaded an effort to tear down the Market House as part of the city's efforts to revitalize its downtown area. In spite of a campaign by preservationists to save the building, which included speeches by poet Carl Sandburg and conservationist Harvey Broome, the city voted to remove the Market House in November 1959 (the building's fate was further sealed when it partially burned a few months later). The old Market House was replaced by the Market Square Mall, an open-air market that consisted of a series of white "toadstool"-shaped canopies in 1961. The mall received a boost with the completion of the TVA Towers at the north end of the Square in 1976, and the construction of Krutch Park in 1981. In 1986, at the urging of historical preservationists, the white canopies were removed, and the Market Square Mall was renamed "Market Square."

Redevelopment of Market Square was first emphasized by Knoxville's urban planners in 1988 with the publication of the 1988 Downtown Knoxville Plan. The master plan which sought to have a public-private partnership improve the urban lifestyle of Knoxville's downtown, promoted the Market Square district as a key point in the plan. In 2002, Knoxville officials approved a $432 million plan to redevelop Market Square into a pedestrian-oriented commercial area. Around the same time, a group of young Knoxville residents organized the Market Square Farmers Market, which strictly promoted the sale of produce in the Greater Knoxville area.

== Culture ==
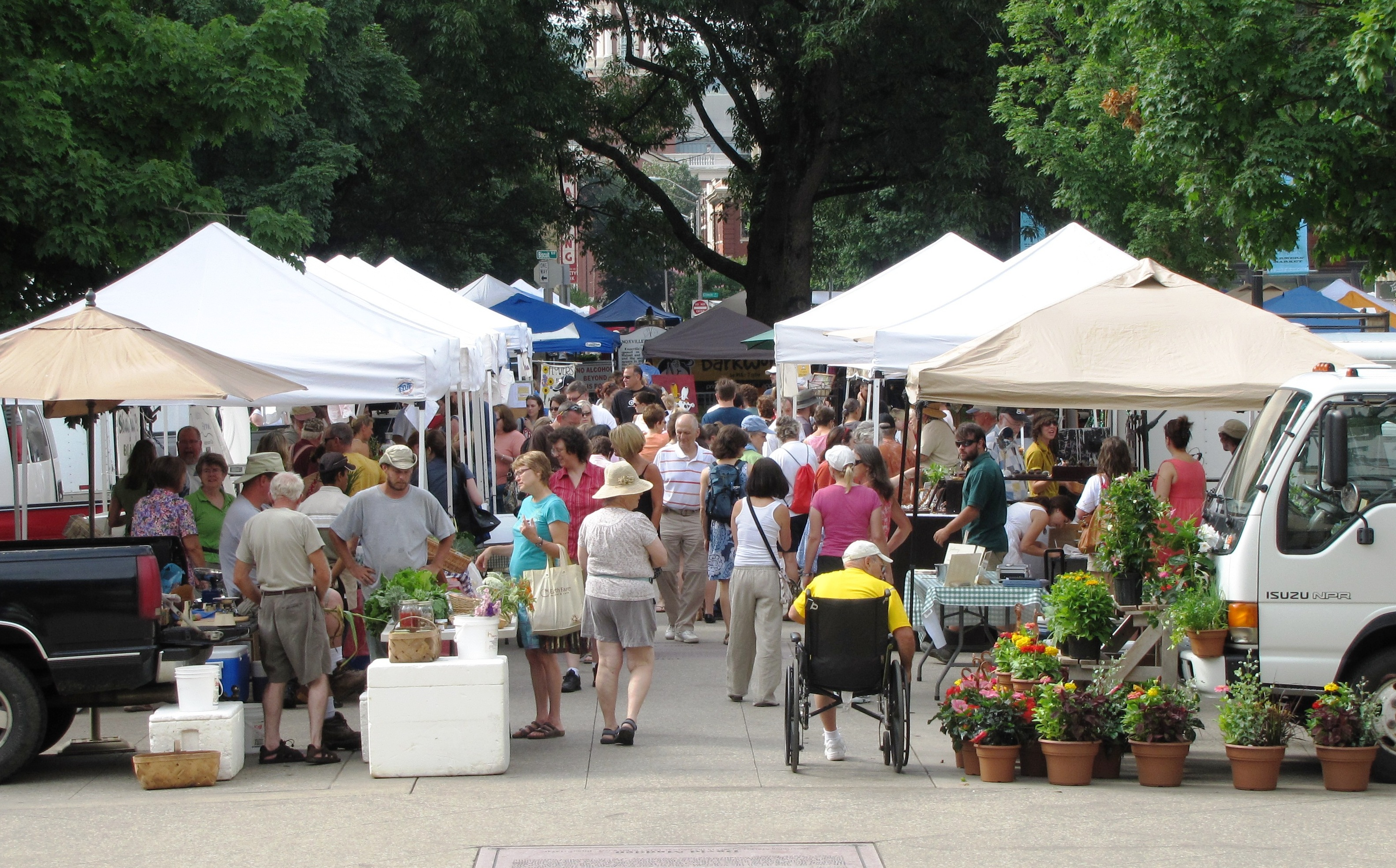
Vendors at Market Square's Farmer's Market

Musicians have been a staple of Market Square since at least the late 1860s, when Peter Kern employed brass bands for various festivities. In the 1880s, "Dr. Lighthall's Mexican Band" first appeared on the Square, and Tennessee politician and fiddler Robert Love Taylor began performing with the "Market Hall Fiddlers." Promoter Frank Murphy held fiddle contests in Market Hall in the 1920s which drew the likes of Charlie Bowman, Earl Johnson, and the Tennessee Ramblers, and during same decade the St. James Hotel (at the northeast end of the Square) hosted the studios of WNOX. By the 1980s, diverse styles such as bluegrass, jazz, folk, and punk were being played in Market Square's clubs. The Sundown in the City concert series, established by AC Entertainment in 1997, regularly drew crowds of 10,000 or more before its conclusion after the 2011 season.

In his Pulitzer Prize-winning 1957 novel, A Death in the Family, James Agee recalled going into a noisy Market Square bar with his father while they walked through downtown Knoxville in 1915. In a later scene, he mentioned his preference for the Market Square store Harbison's, which his mother considered "vulgar," preferring instead Miller's on Gay Street.

Cormac McCarthy gives vivid descriptions of Market Square in both his 1965 novel, The Orchard Keeper, and his 1979 novel, Suttree, both of which are set in Knoxville and its vicinity. In the first, one of the characters walks to Market Square, where he witnesses a street preacher "screaming incoherently and brandishing a tattered Bible," before traversing the market house and eventually buying traps at a hardware store. In Suttree, the title character sells his fish to a Market Square fish vendor, passing along the way "derelict trucks," "pariahs," "blind singers," "organists," "psalmists," "beggars," and "wild street preachers." In a later scene, the character Gene Harrogate peers into the Golden Sun Cafe while on a stroll through the downtown area.

Other books that mention Market Square include Anne Armstrong's 1915 novel, The Seas of God (which is set in a fictional town based on Knoxville), Joseph Wood Krutch's 1962 autobiography, More Lives Than One, and David Madden's 1974 novel, Bijou (also set in a fictional town based on Knoxville). More recently, the Square figures in Richard Marius's An Affair of Honor (2001), Ken Mink's "Knoxville: A City Born in Blood and Flames," featuring Civil War era action involving the city's richest family, the Armstrongs, and the use of their homes as military headquarters and later as a hospital for wounded soldiers, and Richard Yancey's The Highly Effective Detective (2006).

Political groups have been active at Market Square since at least 1876, when politician William F. Yardley spoke before a gathering of Radical Republicans. Temperance activists were among the most vocal in the early 1900s, when temperance leaders such as William Jennings Bryan, Edward Ward Carmack, and Frances Willard gave speeches at Market Hall. Women's suffragist Lizzie Crozier French was active on Market Square as early as the 1880s, and today is depicted in the Square's Women's Suffrage Memorial. Socialist politician Harry McKee spoke at the Square in 1904, and Booker T. Washington delivered a speech on civil rights at the Square in 1909. In 1980, Republican presidential candidate Ronald Reagan spoke before an audience of 6,000 at Market Square. Democratic candidate Walter Mondale spoke at the Square in 1984, but managed to draw just a few hundred.

== Market Square today ==
Market Square is currently used year-round as a venue for special outdoor events, including the Market Square Farmers' Market, an annual open-air presentation of Shakespeare plays, and community band concerts. The bell from the old market house is displayed at the Union Avenue end of Market Square. Nearby is the Women's Suffrage Memorial, a statue created by sculptor Alan LeQuire to commemorate Tennessee's role in achieving Women's suffrage in the United States. An open-air ice skating rink is created in the square every winter.

== Historic district ==
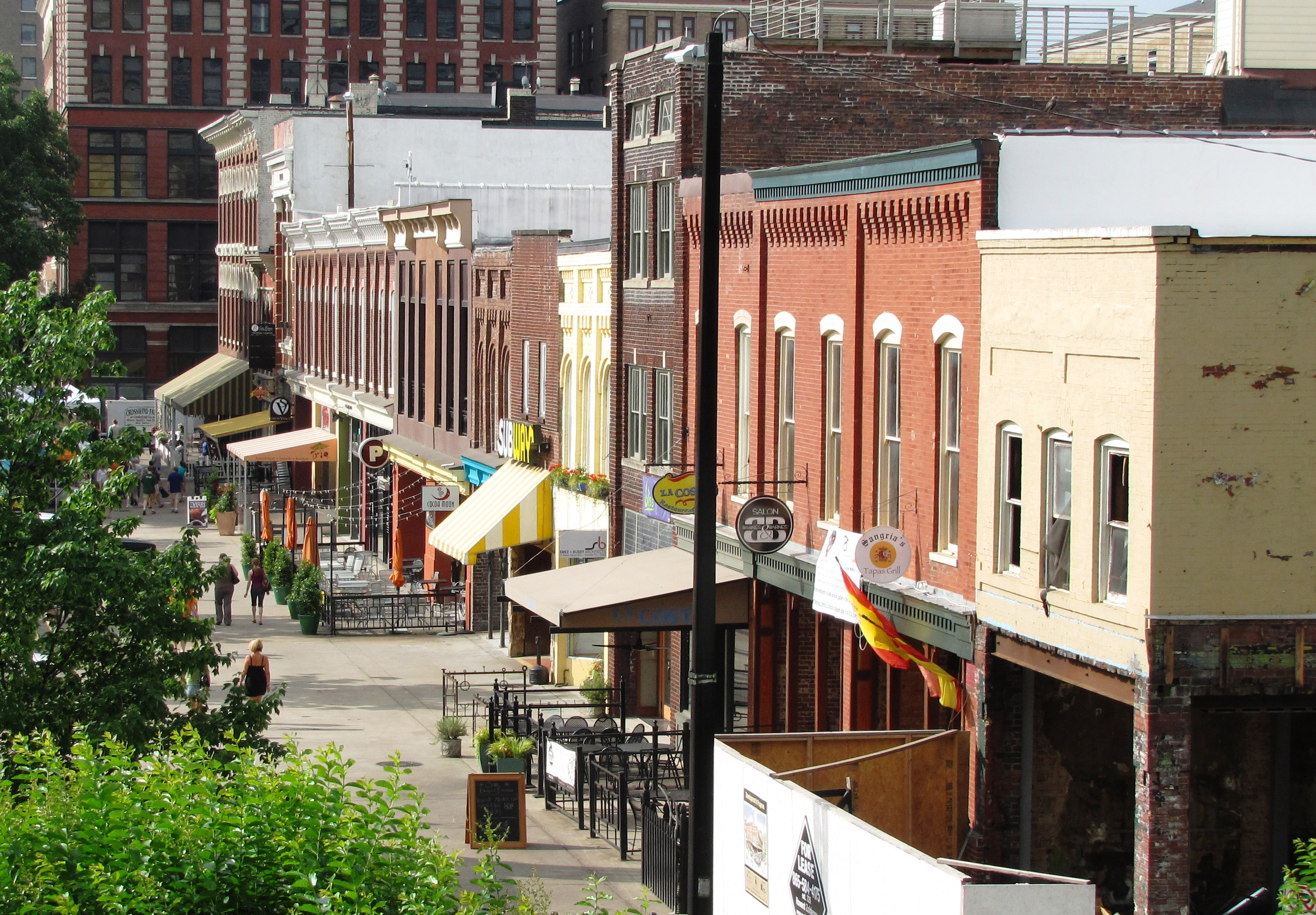
Row of storefronts along the west side of Market Square; the Golden Sun once occupied the yellow building on the far right

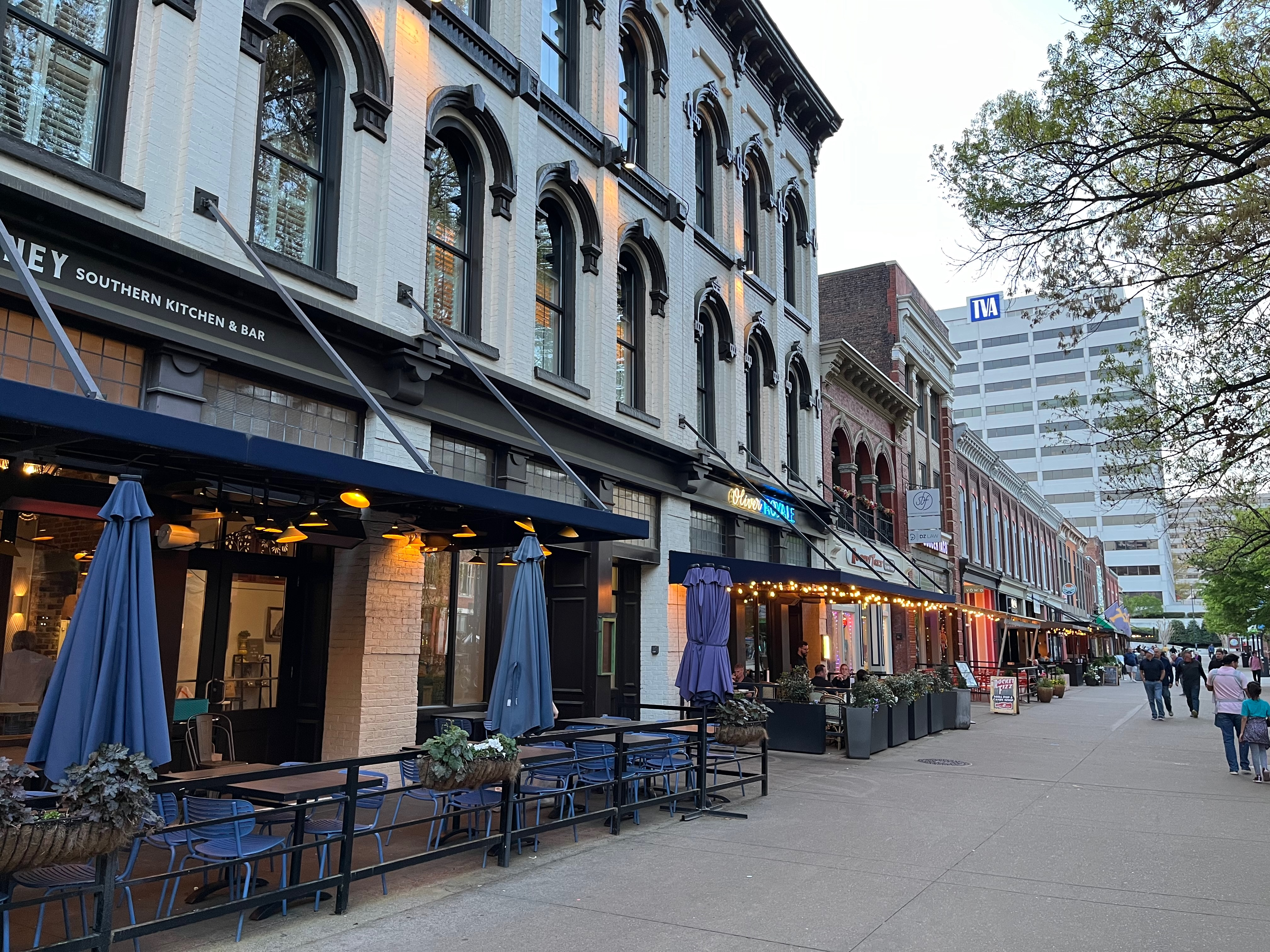
Buildings on the west side of the square in 2025

The square was listed in the National Register of Historic Places as the Market Square Commercial Historic District on December 20, 1984. Buildings surrounding the square illustrate 19th- and 20th-century commercial architecture. Most once housed commercial uses on the ground level and residences in upper floors. The historic district includes twenty contributing buildings, seventeen of which are located on the Square, and three of which are located along Union or Wall avenues. Several historic buildings were listed as "non-contributing" in the 1984 listing due to mid-20th century modifications, but have since been restored.

Buildings of interest in the district include:

- The Oliver Hotel (1 Market Square) is an Italianate building erected in 1876 and designed by Joseph Baumann. It once housed Kern's confectionery and ice cream parlor, owned by Peter Kern. A German immigrant who served in the Confederate Army, Kern was trapped in Knoxville and protected by a local baker when the Union Army blocked routes out of the city. Kern entered a business partnership with the baker and eventually took over the business. The ground floor of the building at 1 Market Square housed his shop, where he sold bread, candy, ice cream, cake and other confections, and an upper floor housed a ballroom where a French dancing master gave lessons. Kern was elected mayor of Knoxville in 1890. In 1982, the top two floors were converted into a hotel, the Blakely House, for visitors to the city's World's Fair. This hotel became the Hotel St. Oliver in the 1990s.
- The Ziegler Building (9 Market Square) is a three-story Neoclassical building constructed around 1880. The building has a pressed metal cornice, decorative pilasters, and a raised parapet wall. Sausage-maker Adolph Ziegler and his associates, Ignaz Fanz and Anton Metler, sold sausage and pork out of the building in the 1880s and 1890s.
- 26 Market Square, a vernacular commercial structure built about 1880, housed the A.L. Young Dry Goods Store from 1880 until 1900. Other dry goods merchants occupied the building until 1950.
- 36 Market Square, built about 1882, is a vernacular commercial that housed a succession of dry goods stores from 1885 until the 1960s.
- 37 Market Square, known as the J.F. Horne Building, is a Victorian vernacular commercial building built around 1870. It housed tobacco and liquor sellers J.F. Horne & Brothers from 1876 until 1905, when it became a restaurant and confectioners shop. The Gold Sun Café was located there from 1920 until at least 1965.
- The Arnstein Building (corner of Union and Market), completed in 1906, was designed by New York architectural firm Cleverdon & Putzel, and was Knoxville's tallest building at the time of its completion. The seven-story building features Neoclassical detailing and limestone quoins. The building housed Max Arnstein's department store until 1927, and in the 1930s it served as office space for the newly created Tennessee Valley Authority. Whittle Communications operated out of the Arnstein Building during the 1980s.
