= Catherine Talty Kenny =

American female activist and politician

- Born: 1874; Chattanooga, Tennessee, United States
- Died: 1950 (aged 75–76); New York City, United States
- Occupations: Activist; political organizer
- Organizations: Tennessee Equal Suffrage Association; Tennessee League of Women Voters
- Known for: Women's suffrage activism
- Title: President of the Tennessee League of Women Voters
- Term: 1921–1927
- Spouse: John M. Kenny
- Children: 4

Catherine Talty Kenny was an American female activist and politician. She was the vice president of the Tennessee Equal Suffrage Association, Inc. and later elected as the president of Tennessee League of Women Voters.

== Life and career ==
Kennedy was born in 1874 in Chattanooga, Tennessee. Catherine grew up with five siblings, in a poor and religiously segregated part of town. Her father died in a yellow fever epidemic in 1878. Catherine's widowed mother struggled to support her six children working as a seamstress and Catherine eventually left school and worked odd jobs to help support the family.

In 1899, Catherine married John M. Kenny, a man from Atlanta. They relocated to Nashville, Tennessee, where his work for a wholesale coffee company and local connections led to an opportunity to open a Coca-Cola bottling company franchise. Catherine and John had four children during their early years in Nashville. The Coca-Cola business was booming and the family was able to relocate into a large house in the more well off West End area of Nashville. During this time, Catherine began to develop an interest in politics that she claims grew out of her mothering responsibilities.

In 1911, the Nashville Equal Suffrage League was formed and Kenny was active with the organization by 1913. Her work with this organization allowed her to make political connections with women active in the suffrage movement and she quickly became the spokeswoman for the organization. In 1914, when Ben Hooper was running for governor, Kenny began working with the progressive Democratic coalition that supported Hooper and, in turn, began working with Luke Lea, who ran the coalition and owned the Nashville Tennessean newspaper. With this partnership, Kenny began organizing events to bring attention to the suffrage cause in Nashville including a suffrage parade on May 2, 1914, the first of such parades to occur in the south. The parade route went from the state capitol building to Centennial Park, culminating with a rally at the Parthenon in Centennial Park

After these successes, later in 1914, Kenny was elected vice president of the Tennessee Equal Suffrage Association, Inc., two weeks before the National American Woman Suffrage Association convention in Nashville. At the convention she joined with fellow suffragist, Abby Crawford Milton from Chattanooga to organize suffrage clubs in rural counties.

In 1915, Kenny and Milton coordinated strategies between suffragists groups across the state as they co-chaired the campaign committee for the Tennessee Equal Suffrage Association and developed a plan to introduce an amendment to give women the right to vote in Tennessee, giving Kenny lobbying experience at the state capitol. The proposed amendment was tabled at the 1917 convention. While the proposed amendment was never adopted, the work of Kenny and others across the state led to the adoption of a bill in 1919 allowing women in Tennessee to vote for presidential electors and in municipal elections. Kenny was the first woman to pay the poll tax in Davidson County after the bill was passed.

This experience put Kenny in the position of leading the efforts to support the state's ratification of the 19th Amendment, which ultimately granted women the right to vote nationwide. Kenny became the chairmen for the ratification committee for both the Tennessee League of Women Voters and the Tennessee Equal Suffrage League and led the efforts in Tennessee toward successful ratification in 1920. One of the tactics Kenny deployed was to put pressure on Governor Roberts by getting the White House to send a telegram urging him to ratify the amendment, eventually leading to Roberts calling a special session of the Tennessee legislature.

In 1921, Kenny was elected president of the Tennessee League of Women Voters and remained in that position until 1927. During this time, support for women in Tennessee fell and Kenny resigned the position and left politics out of frustration. Her husband died in 1927 after which Kenny moved to New York City where she remained until she died in 1950.

== Additional Resources ==
Bucy, C. (1996). "The Thrill of History Making": Suffrage Memories of Abby Crawford Milton. Tennessee Historical Quarterly, 55(3), 224–239. Retrieved March 16, 2021, from http://www.jstor.org/stable/42628433

Boston Women's Heritage Trail Facebook Group page about Catherine Talty Kenny https://m.facebook.com/BostonWHT/photos/a.10152203494780425/10163305579925425/?type=3&source=57&__tn__=EH-R

Goodstein, A. (1998). A Rare Alliance: African American and White Women in the Tennessee Elections of 1919 and 1920. The Journal of Southern History, 64(2), 219–246. doi:10.2307/2587945

"Catherine Talty Kenny" Iowa State University Archives of Women's Political Communication https://awpc.cattcenter.iastate.edu/directory/catherine-talty-kenny/

McDaniel, Aubrie R. (2020). Rural realities shape rural Tennessee Women's attitudes about woman suffrage (Order No. 27830949). Available from ProQuest Dissertations & Theses Global. (2404290750).

Mines, Linda Mass (2021). "Mines: The path toward women's suffrage" Chattanooga Times Free Press https://www.timesfreepress.com/news/opinion/columns/story/2020/aug/15/mines-path-toward-womens-suffrage/529767/

Stanton, E. Cady., Harper, I. Husted., Gage, M. Joslyn., Anthony, S. B. (18811922). History of woman suffrage. New York: Fowler & Wells. https://catalog.hathitrust.org/Record/001142954/Home

Tennessee Woman Suffrage Heritage Trail https://tnwomansuffrageheritagetrail.com/resources/

Weiss, Elaine F. The Woman's Hour: the Great Fight to Win the Vote. Viking, 2018.
