= Juno Frankie Pierce =

American educator, suffragist

- Born: Juno Frankie Seay c. 1864; Nashville, Tennessee, US
- Died: 1954 (aged 89–90)
- Occupations: Educator, suffragist
- Spouse: Clement J. Pierce

Juno Frankie Seay Pierce, also known as Frankie Pierce or J. Frankie Pierce (c. 1864 – 1954), was an African American educator and suffragist. Pierce opened the Tennessee Vocational School for Colored Girls in 1923, and she served as its superintendent until 1939. The school continued to operate until 1979. The daughter of a slave, Pierce addressed white women at the inaugural convention of the Tennessee League of Women Voters, held in the Tennessee Capitol in May 1920.

== Early life and education ==
Born Juno Frankie Seay in Nashville, Tennessee, about 1864, her father was Frank Seay, a freedman, and her mother, Nellie Seay, was a house slave to Colonel Robert Allen, a member of the United States House of Representatives from Smith County. Frankie Pierce attended John G. McKee Freedmen's School, established as a Presbyterian mission and located in Nashville. She continued her education at Roger Williams University in Nashville.

== Career ==
She taught at Bellview School, a public school for black children.

=== Tennessee Vocational School for Colored Girls ===
In Nashville, black women organized church-related and secular clubs in order to pursue their social-justice goals, such as better schools, childcare, and settlement houses. Frankie Pierce was a founder of the Negro Women's Reconstruction League, which she served as president. She was a founder of the Nashville Federation of Colored Women's Clubs and also served on the first Management Committee of the Blue Triangle League of the YWCA.

Members of these clubs led by Frankie Pierce marched to the mayor's office to demand public restrooms for black women in downtown Nashville. As a result, Montgomery Ward installed restrooms for black women in its store.

One of Frankie Pierce's goals was to establish a state-supported vocational school for delinquent black children. Because black children could not attend white schools, the only alternative was to take them to prison. Pierce worked with the clubs to lobby for the legislation to establish the school, helped by Fisk University's registrar Minnie Lou Crosthwaite. After the passage of the 19th Amendment in 1920, giving women the right to vote throughout the nation, the Tennessee General Assembly passed a bill creating the Tennessee Vocational School for Colored Girls on April 7, 1921.

The school opened at 2700 Heiman Street in Nashville on October 8, 1923. The school provided academic and vocational training to girls aged 12–15, through the ninth grade. Frankie Pierce served as its superintendent, a position she held until 1939. She implemented a program of personal development that emphasized health, recreation, physical needs, moral training, and religion. The school served 35 students from across Tennessee in its opening years but grew after that.

The school was supported by the City Federation of Colored Women's Clubs, for which Pierce served as an organizer. Dr. Mattie E. Coleman followed Pierce as superintendent and served until her death in 1942.

=== Suffrage movement ===
Frankie Pierce and Mattie E. Coleman, an African-American physician and leading feminist in the Colored Methodist Episcopal Church, were among Tennessee's most active black suffragists. They helped to get 2,500 black women to vote in the 1919 Nashville municipal elections, the city's first election in which black women were eligible to vote.

By 1919, as people in Tennessee worked for or against becoming the 36th state to ratify the Nineteenth Amendment to the United States Constitution, giving women the right to vote, the suffrage movement was mostly segregated, especially in the Jim Crow South. But the black women's clubs worked with white women's clubs on various social issues, and these connections fostered an alliance in Nashville on suffrage. The black women's clubs had worked with the white suffrage organizations to get out the vote in the 1919 municipal elections.

Catherine Kenny, Chair of the Tennessee Equal Suffrage League, was impressed with Frankie Pierce's organizational skills and invited her to address the first convention of the Tennessee League of Women Voters, held in the Tennessee Capitol in May 1920. This address of a black woman to several hundred white women in the Tennessee Capitol is called by Elaine Weiss "a taboo-breaking experiment in political cooperation".

In her address, Frankie Pierce asked, "What will the Negro woman do with the vote?...Yes, we will stand by the white women. We are optimistic because we have faith in the best white women of the country, of Nashville. We are going to make you proud of us, because we are going to help you help us and yourselves." She continued, "We are interested in the same moral uplift of the community in which we live as you are... We are asking only one thing—a square deal." The platform she offered these white women was a state vocational school, a child welfare department of the state, and more room in state schools.” The League adopted the school as part of its legislative agenda and lobbied extensively for it.

Anita Goodstein calls the black women’s offer of cooperation with white suffragists in return for specific benefits a “rare alliance” and observes that it happened only in Nashville. She credits Frankie Pierce, Mattie E. Coleman, and Catherine Kenny for their boldness.

== Personal life ==
She married Clement J. Pierce and moved with him to Paris, Texas. After his death, she returned to Nashville to live with her mother, Nellie Seay. With her mother, she was active in the First Colored Baptist Church, Capitol Hill.

Pierce's niece, Nellie Griswold Francis, was also a prominent suffragist, as well as an anti-lynching and civil rights activist.

== Legacy ==
The Frankie J. Pierce lecture series was organized by Tennessee women including State Senator Thelma Harper and Representative Lettie Galloway to celebrate African-American women's history. On August 26, 2016, as part of Women's Equality Day, a monument by Alan LeQuire was unveiled in Centennial Park in Nashville, featuring depictions of Pierce, Carrie Chapman Catt, Anne Dallas Dudley, Abby Crawford Milton, and Sue Shelton White.

== See also ==
- List of suffragists and suffragettes

== Bibliography ==
- Bucy, Carole Stanford. "Juno Frankie Pierce". Tennessee Encyclopedia.
- Fancher, Evelyn P. "Tennessee Vocational School for Colored Girls". Tennessee Encyclopedia.
- Goodstein, Anita Shafer (May 1998). "A Rare Alliance: African American and White Women in the Tennessee Elections of 1919 and 1920". The Journal of Southern History. 64 (2): 219–246. doi:10.2307/2587945. JSTOR 2587945.
- Weiss, Elaine (2018). The Woman's Hour: The Great Fight to Win the Vote. Penguin. ISBN 9780698407831.
- Yellin, Carol Lynn; Sherman, Janann (2016). The Perfect 36: Tennessee Delivers Woman Suffrage (Second ed.). Memphis, TN: Vote 70 Press. ISBN 9780974245652.
