= Lide Meriwether =

Lide S. Meriwether
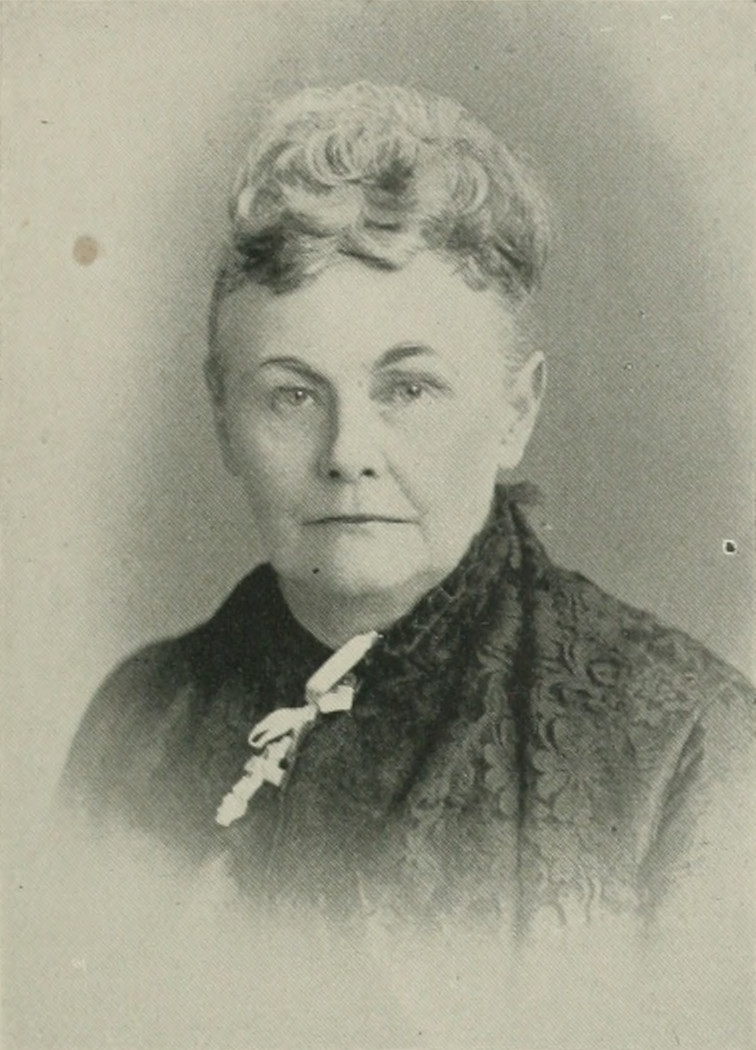
- Born: Lide Parker Smith; October 16, 1829; Columbus, Ohio, US
- Died: September 28, 1913 (aged 83); Haverstraw, New York, US
- Resting place: Elmwood Cemetery, Memphis, Tennessee, US
- Occupations: Writer, teacher, suffragist
- Years active: 1871–1913
- Known for: Women's Suffrage Movement
- Notable work: Soundings (1872)

Lide Smith Meriwether (October 16, 1829 – September 28, 1913) was a leader of the first generation of feminists and women's rights activists. She lobbied for prohibition, raising the legal age of consent, and woman's suffrage. Meriwether was president of the Tennessee Woman's Christian Temperance Union (WCTU) from 1884 to 1897, and then as an honorary president for life. In 1889, she organized the first Equal Rights Association in Memphis, and served as president of the Tennessee Equal Rights Association from 1897 to 1900, and subsequently was made honorary president for life.

== Early life ==
Lide Meriwether (née Lide Parker Smith) was born in Columbus, Ohio, on October 16, 1829, while her parents were visiting away from their home in Virginia. Her father was a prominent educator, and her mother died a few days after her birth. She and her sister attended school at the Emma Willard Seminary (later known as the Washington Female Seminary) in Washington, Pennsylvania, which was run by Sarah Foster Hanna, a graduate of the famous Troy Female Seminary. Soon after graduation, the sisters headed west and became teachers in Memphis, Tennessee. In 1856 she married Niles Meriwether, with whom she had three daughters. The marriage linked her to another prominent activist, Elizabeth Avery Meriwether. The Meriwethers become outspoken on a wide range of issues related to woman's position in society, and their position as aristocratic southern ladies insulated them from a great extent of damaging criticism. Their husbands were supportive of their wives' public activities, and played important roles in the Taxing District oligarchy. The two families shared a residence in Memphis for a time, and were productive as influential and civic-minded members of society.

Meriwether's evolution as a feminist social reformer began later in life, in response to the "stage of disorder" resulting from the Civil War and Reconstruction in the South, where prostitution in Memphis remained a viable source of income for poor women and girls. The plight of these women spurred a new chapter of feminism to fight back against female degradation, which included concerns of sexually transmitted diseases, out-of-wedlock births, and sexual abuse of minors.

== The Tablet ==
In 1871, Meriwether inaugurated a pro-women's rights newspaper, the Tablet, which she used to publicly criticize Tennessee's laws that discriminated against married women and to protest against the dearth of wage-earning and professional options available to women. During the Civil War, many women stepped into the role of educators, and local politicians saw this as an exploitable opportunity, paying them only half of what male teachers were paid. Through the Tablet, Memphis' female teachers voiced their support for equal pay and work, leading to the formation of teacher and librarian organizations and the drawing of a proposal demanding that teachers be paid on the basis of merit, not gender. They also insisted that the all-male school board include women, and proposed Clara Conway, a popular teacher and women's education activist, to serve as superintendent of public schools.

== Soundings ==
In 1872, Meriwether published Soundings, a book dedicated to the condition of the "fallen woman", which was an attack on the double standard and hypocrisy of genteel society. The publication was a rare public condemnation of male sexual license in the South. It called attention to the unequal and unjust application of social standards across gender at a time that wage inequality represented the difficulty women encountered in providing for themselves and obtaining financial independence. This could lead women to economic desperation that forced them to obtain money in ways that incurred society's condemnation, such as prostitution. Meriwether did not shy away from confrontational language, also pointing an accusatory finger at "respectable" women for not doing their part in helping their fellow women. Meriwether continued to advocate for "unfortunate women", founding the Ella Oliver Refuge, a women's shelter in Memphis. Meriwether also took women into her own home to rehabilitate them.

== Elopement and murder ==
In 1882, her two daughters both eloped on the same night. Her daughter Virginia eloped and married Lowe Davis despite her mother's objections. After the honeymoon her daughter discovered that he was an opium and gambling addict and she returned to the care of her mother. Lide Meriwether took her daughter to the spa of Rhea Springs to recover. Lowe Davis agreed to let her alone but he visited her with a gun which Lide Meriwether persuaded him to relinquish. He left but returned later with another gun with which he threatened her daughter. Virginia now had the first gun and shot him in the stomach. Lowe Davis left and before he died he admitted that Virginia had shot him in self-defense and he deserved it. Meriwether was sent off from the scandal to train as a doctor in New York.

== Women's Christian Temperance Union ==
In the 1880s, Meriwether became highly active, touring the state and founding local chapters of the WCTU, including unions of African American women. Meriwether spearheaded the first efforts to organize black women chapters, and in 1886 she presided over one of the first interracial meetings in Memphis. Many participating well-educated young black women found common ground with their white counterparts through these meetings, anxious to participate in reform they deemed essential to the future progress of their race. By 1887, there were 14 African American women WCTU unions in Tennessee, and two black women attended the state WCTU convention, reporting much success.

In 1884, Meriwether became president of the Tennessee WCTU, and working closely with state organizer Elizabeth Lyle Saxon invigorated the temperance movement. She and Saxon also played leading roles in passing the Age of Consent Law, raising the age of consent in the state from 10 to 16, and later 18 years of age. Although the topic of sex was viewed as "indelicate" for a public debate, the activists were undeterred in advocating for their goal. In 1885, both women pushed the WCTU toward supporting women's suffrage, adding a suffrage plank to its platform and working diligently writing letters, making speeches, and traveling in Tennessee on behalf of the movement.

Meriwether was a prolific speaker, encouraging women to speak up for women's rights everywhere she traveled. In 1887, Meriwether spoke at a state WCTU convention in Nashville, saying:

Whoever hesitates to utter that which she thinks the highest truth, lest it should be too much in advance of the time, must remember that while she is a child of the past, she is also a parent of the future, and her thoughts are children born to her, which she may not carelessly let die.

She cautioned women against blindly accepting conservative positions on women, society, and race, telling them to "think, and speak, and act precisely as seemeth good in your own sight." Through the WCTU, the women's suffrage movement gained significant traction. When Meriwether, Saxon, and Wells spoke before the Tennessee legislature in favor of prohibition, it was "the first time that women's voices had ever been heard in those halls... and common justice forced the hearers to admit that the three women of the WCTU could be both logical and eloquent."

== Later activism ==
In 1895, Meriwether petitioned against the classification of women on the same level as minors, aliens, paupers, criminals, and idiots, and advocated legal reform giving women title to their own clothing and earnings, guardianship of their children, and the right to vote.

In 1897, Meriwether presided over the Tennessee Centennial Exposition in Nashville, and by the end of the convention the Tennesseans had formed the Tennessee Equal Rights Association, of which Meriwether was unanimously elected president. She was already president of the state WCTU, and at the age of 65 decided to step down from the former position to take on the new one. She was subsequently named honorary president for life of the Tennessee WCTU.

It wasn't until 1900, at the age of 71, that Meriwether retired from the position of president at the second Tennessee Equal Rights Association convention, and again named honorary president for life. Nine months later, Meriwether's husband of 45 years died unexpectedly on December 28, 1900. Meriwether continued to be active until her death in 1913, while she visited her daughter Virginia in New York City. Her obituary in the Memphis News-Scimitar memorialized her work, calling her "the prime mover in the cause of suffrage in Tennessee."

== Legacy ==
Meriwether saw prohibition finally make headway in Tennessee, but did not live long enough to see women get the vote. The Nineteenth Amendment was ratified on August 18, 1920.

Meriwether's daughter, Mattie Betts, joined the National American Woman Suffrage Association in 1893, and was elected recording secretary of the Tennessee Equal Rights Association. Betts eventually became president of the Memphis Political Equality League, which her own adult daughter joined. Betts herself became deeply entrenched in the struggle for the ratification of the Nineteenth Amendment in 1920, and was also a member of WCTU and the Nineteenth Century Club.

On 2006, the Woman Suffrage Memorial was unveiled in Knoxville, Tennessee, honoring key women integral to the woman's suffrage movement. The sculpture, created by Alan LeQuire, depicts three suffragists - Lizzie Crozier French, Anne Dallas Dudley, and Elizabeth Avery Meriwether. Lide Meriwether's name was listed along with other key activists on the sculpture's banner.
