= Lilian Wyckoff Johnson =

American teacher of history

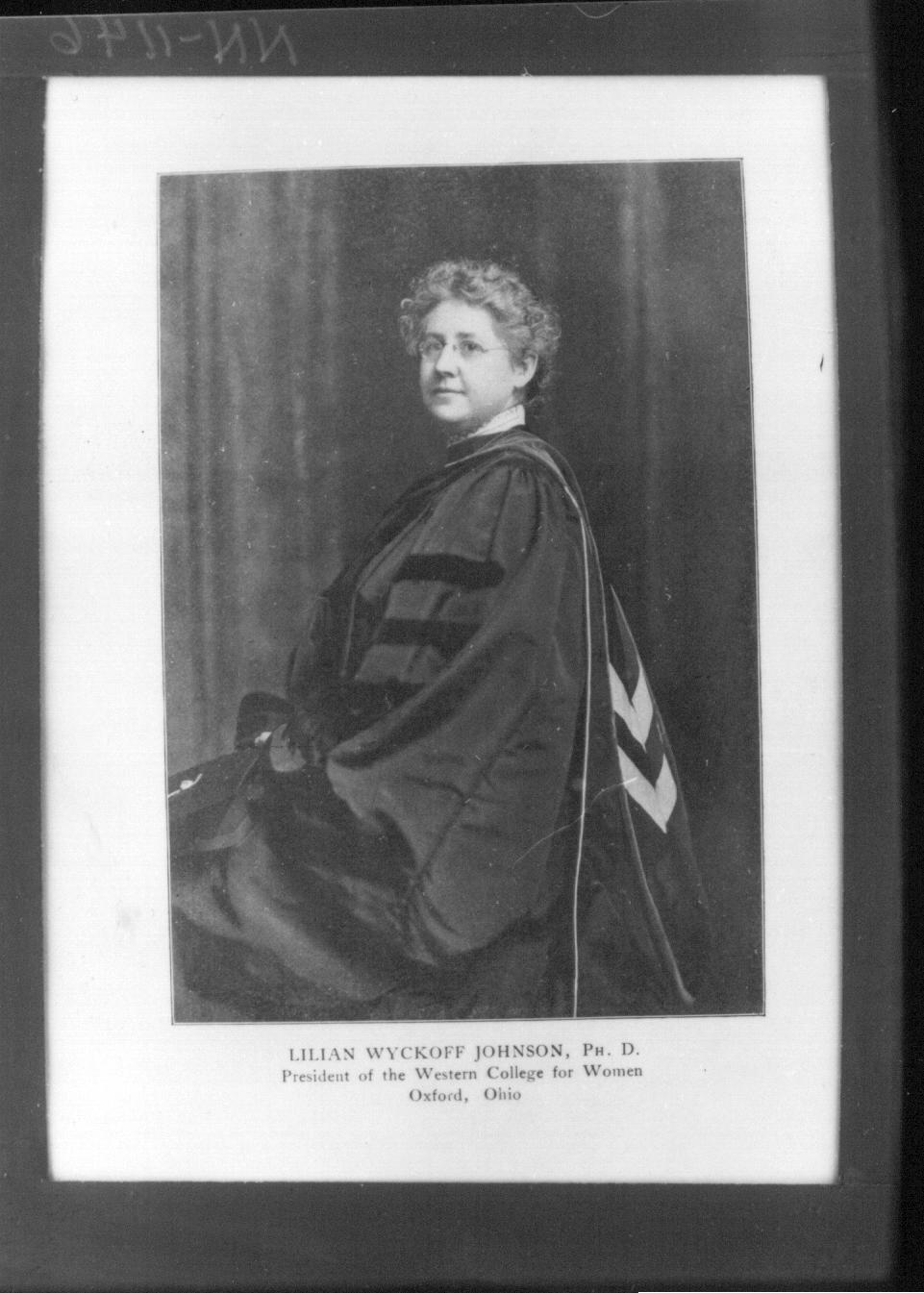
- Born: June 19, 1864; Memphis, Tennessee
- Died: September 22, 1956 (aged 92); Bradenton, Florida
- Education: Ph.D.
- Alma mater: Wellesley College; University of Michigan; Cornell University
- Occupation: History teacher
- Known for: President of Western College for Women (1904−1906)
- Parent(s): John Cumming Johnson; Elizabeth Fisher

Lilian Wyckoff Johnson (June 19, 1864 − September 22, 1956) was an American teacher of history and an advocate for rural reform and civil rights.

She was born in Memphis, Tennessee to John Cumming Johnson and Elizabeth Fisher. Both of her parents valued education and were strong proponents of community service. Her mother headed up the Memphis Women's Christian Association and was the first president of the Women's Christian Temperance Union. After an early education in private schools, in 1878 Lilian was sent to Dayton, Ohio to take refuge during a yellow fever outbreak; while there, she attended the Cooper Academy. Her parents then sent the 15 year old Lilian and her sister to Wellesley College in 1879, with the first two years being spent in preparatory school. However, Lilian had to return home upon the death of her mother in 1883, and was unable to complete her studies.

After spending a year at a State Normal School in Cortland, New York, she returned home to teach at Hope Night School. She matriculated to the University of Michigan, receiving an A.B. in 1891. Returning to her home town, she became a faculty member at the Clara Conway Institute, a private school. Lilian joined the staff of Vassar College in 1893, which at the time was a women's college, and there she taught history for four years. In 1897 she travelled to Europe and studied at the Sorbonne and the University of Leipzig. Returning to the United States, she enrolled at Cornell University and was awarded an Andrew D. White Fellowship. In 1902, she was awarded a Ph.D. from Cornell; the thesis for her Medieval History doctorate was titled, Calvin and Religious Tolerance.

Following her graduation, Lilian became a professor at the University of Tennessee, teaching history in the newly formed Department of Education. She helped to form the Southern Association of College Women in 1903, which served as an intercollegiate union of female graduate students from southern colleges. From 1904 until 1906, she served as the president of Western College for Women, but was forced to retire from the position due to fatigue and ill health. To recuperate, she traveled abroad, visiting Egypt, Greece, the Palestine, and Turkey.

Lilian accepted a job to teach at Memphis Central High School in 1908. She served as chair of the Nineteenth Century Club, who were working to get a college located in Memphis. Their efforts were ultimately successful when the Tennessee Normal School opened in 1912. However, Lilian was not given a post at the school she had helped establish. Instead, after traveling to Europe, she joined David Lubin in establishing a commission to study the idea of establishing agricultural cooperatives in the United States. Their work was brought to a close with the start of World War I.

In 1915, she settled at Summerfield near Monteagle, Tennessee and built a home on a plateau, which came to serve as a center for social and cooperative projects. It was named the KinCo, short for Kindred Company/Kinder Company. She served on the Summerfield Board of Education for seven years, and was the board chairman from 1927 to 1928. While there, she helped create the first credit union for farmers in Tennessee and worked to establish an agricultural economy in the local community. In 1932, she donated her home for use as the Highlander Folk School, an interracial school, and relocated to Memphis to be near her family.

She retired in Bradenton, Florida, where she worked for the Women's Christian Temperance Movement.
