= Nellie O'Donnell =

American educator and clubwoman (1867–1931)

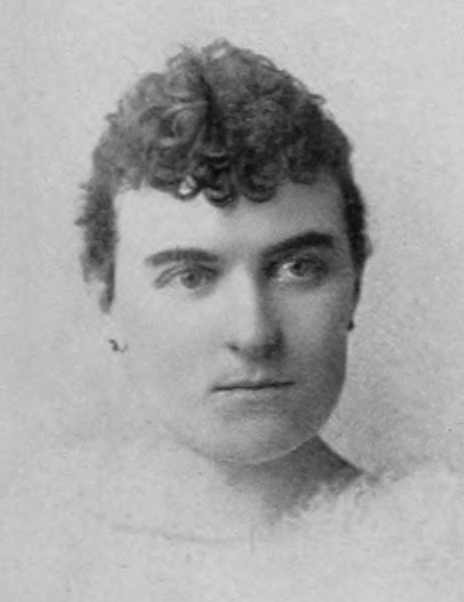
O'Donnell in 1893

Eleanor O'Donnell McCormack (June 2, 1867 – February 28, 1931) was an American educator and clubwoman from the U.S. state of Ohio. She was a teacher and principal in the public schools of Tennessee and was elected superintendent of public schools for Shelby County. When elected, there were 148 schools in the county. She increased the number and brought them to a higher standard.

== Early years and education ==
O'Donnell was born in Chillicothe, Ohio, on June 2, 1867. Her parents were both natives of Massachusetts. Her mother was born in Brookline and her father in Auburndale. Her parents moved the family to Memphis, Tennessee, when she was a child. She was educated in St. Agnes Academy, where she graduated in 1885.

== Career ==
In 1886, O'Donnell was hired as a teacher in the public schools. The following year, she was made principal of a school in the 13th district. After two years in that capacity, she was elected superintendent of public schools in Shelby County, Tennessee, and was reelected in 1891.

O'Donnell extended the average school-term from seven to nine months. She established 16 high schools, 11 for white children and five for black; held normal training-schools for teachers during each summer vacation, one for the white and one for the colored teachers, and held monthly institutes during the months when the schools were in session. She believed in technical training and continued study. When she first assumed the duties of superintendent, she found 148 schools open in the county, and brought it up to 217. She introduced higher mathematics and book-keeping, rhetoric, higher English, civil government, natural philosophy, physiology and the history of Tennessee as studies in the high schools. O'Donnell added vocal music as a study in all the schools.

O'Donnell was the president of the Beethoven Club for three terms, organizer and regent of the Commodore Lawrence chapter of the Daughters of American Revolution, contributor to newspapers and periodicals, and author of historical essays. In 1908 she became President of the State Federation of Women's Clubs of Tennessee. In 1912 she became the President of The Nineteenth Century Club, one of the oldest of Tennessee women's clubs.

In 1920, together with her sister-in-law, she was granted license to practice as lawyer in the courts. When asked why she chose to become a lawyer, she replied "Primarily to be able to be of assistance to those who are in need of legal advice, but cannot afford to pay for it."

== Personal life ==
In 1900, O'Donnell married James Michael McCormack of the McCormack-Richards company. She lived at 7 S. McLean, Memphis. She is buried at Calvary Cemetery, Nashville.
