= Virginia Meriwether Davies =

American physician

Lucy Virginia Meriwether Davies, M.D.
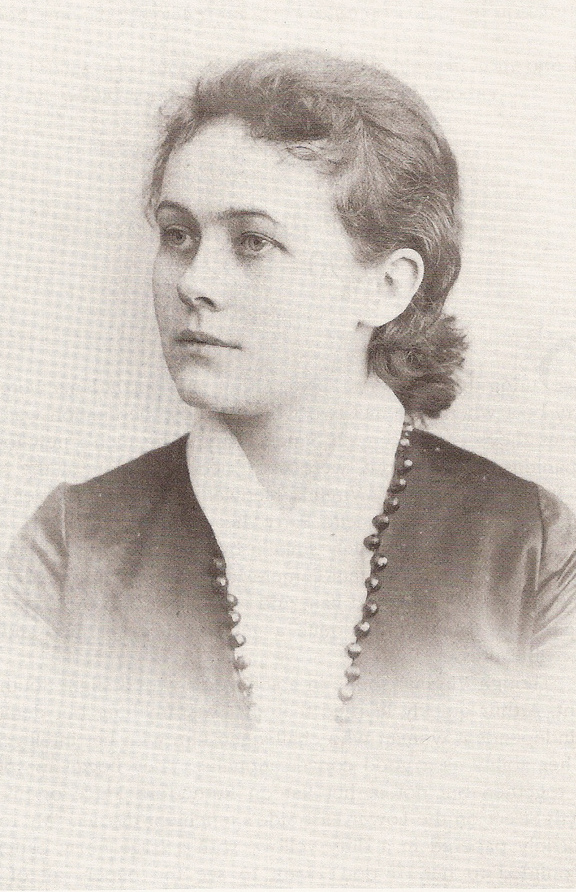
- Virginia Meriwether Davies
- Born: Lucy Virginia Meriwether; April 18, 1862; Huntsville, Alabama, US
- Died: April 17, 1949 (aged 86); Congers, New York, US
- Other name: "Dockie"
- Education: Woman's Medical College of the New York Infirmary for Indigent Women and Children (class of 1886)
- Occupation: Physician
- Organization: New York Infant Asylum
- Known for: One of the first female doctors in the United States

Lucy Virginia Meriwether Davis Davies (April 18, 1862 – April 17, 1949) was one of the first female physicians in New York State. She was also a botanist, civil libertarian, suffragist, philosopher and lover of music and art. She had studied medicine to escape a scandal after she eloped with and then killed her first husband. He had agreed it was self-defense before he died. She married again only to find out years later that her husband was a bigamist, having two complete families and two wives.

== Early life ==
Lucy Virginia "Dockie" Meriwether was born in Huntsville, Alabama, on April 18, 1862. The daughter of Lide Parker Smith and Niles Meriwether, she took a personal independence naturally.

In 1882 she graduated from the Augusta Female Seminary in Stanton, Virginia.

== Career ==
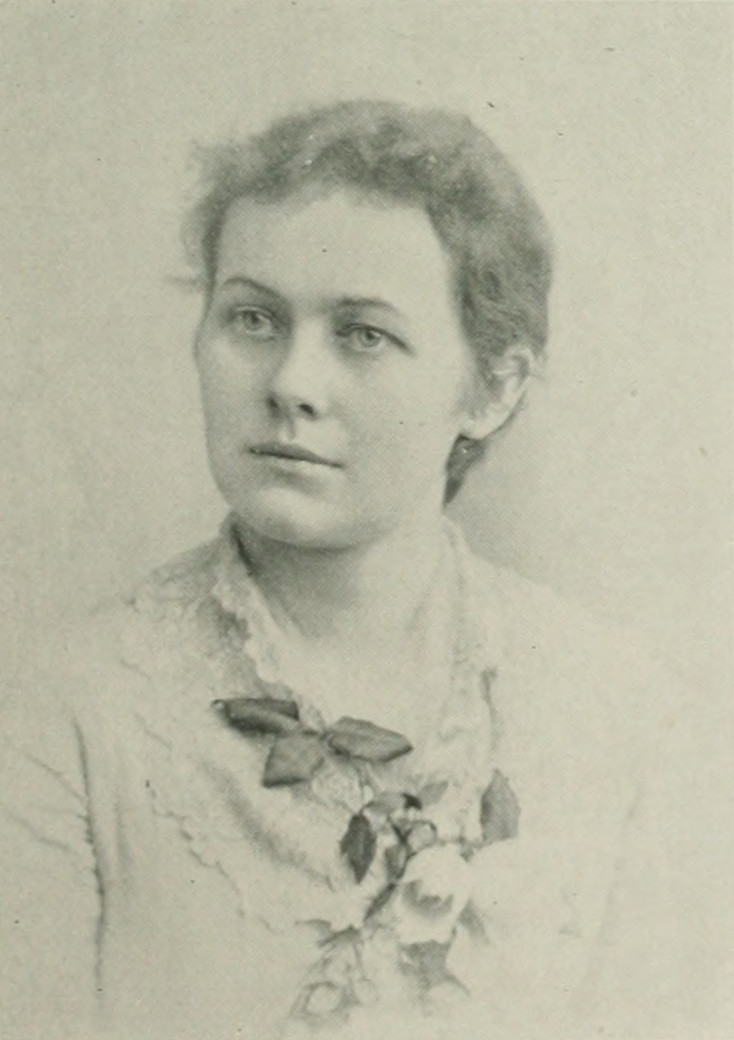
"A Woman of the Century"

There was a lot of gossip after she shot and killed her husband even though everyone including the victim agreed it was self-defence. To avoid this, Virginia Meriwether Davis did not go home but went to New York to study medicine at the New York Infirmary for Indigent Women and Children of which Dr. Emily Blackwell was founder and dean. She was graduated in 1886 from the Woman's Medical College with the honors of her class, becoming one of the first female doctors in the United States, and remained in New York to practice.

Meriwether conducted her medical work almost exclusively in connection with the New York Infant Asylum, where she served as resident physician for four years. The institution had at the time the largest lying-in service conducted by women in the United States, and the lowest mortality and sick rates of any maternity wards in the world.

== Personal life ==
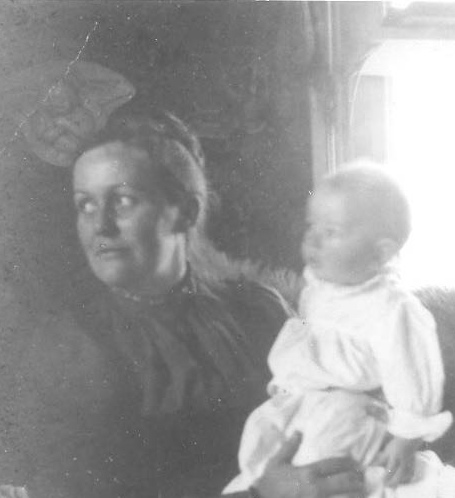
Virginia Meriwether Davies and son

Four months after her graduation in 1882, Virginia Meriwether and her sister both eloped on the same night. Virginia eloped with Lowe Davis, but after the honeymoon, she discovered that her new husband was an opium and gambling addict. She left Davis and returned to the care of her mother, who took her away to the spa of Rhea Springs to recover. Lowe Davis agreed to leave her alone, but he visited her with a gun, which Meriwether's mother persuaded him to relinquish. Davis left but returned later with another gun, with which he threatened Meriwether. Using the gun her mother had taken from him, Meriwether shot him in the abdomen. Her husband left the home, and before he died, he admitted that Meriwether had shot him in self-defense. Meriwether reportedly showed little emotion at becoming a widow.

In 1892, Meriwether married Arthur Bowen Davies (1862–1928), an initially unsuccessful, but later renowned, artist, whom she had met in 1890 while working as chief resident physician at the New York Infant Asylum. Her parents bought her a farm which they had discovered together, although at one point she had considered buying the property with a woman called Lucile du Pre, who was reportedly very attracted to Meriwether. Arthur Virginia Davies had two sons, Niles Meriwether Davies, Sr. (b. 1893) and Arthur David Davies (b. 1895). When Arthur Davies died in 1928, Virginia discovered that he had kept hidden a second life, with another common-law wife, Edna, and family. Edna discovered that she was given a subsistence allowance by Arthur, despite his financial success as an artist.

Virginia Davies died on April 17, 1949, at her farm in Congers, New York. At the age of 87, she was the oldest practicing woman physician in New York State.

== Legacy ==
The Virginia M. Davies Correspondence, 1891–1935 is preserved at Helen Farr Sloan Library & Archives, Delaware Art Museum.

Davies Farm, the only working farm left in Congers, is owned by Niles Meriwether Davies Jr., grandson of Virginia Meriwether Davies. The farm was a wedding present of Virginia Meriwether Davies's father to his daughter. The 110-acre farm on the eastern side of Lake DeForest produces corn, squash and 20 varieties of apples. Every summer, the Davies Farm hosts the "Pick Your Own" apple sales.
