= Lyle Saxon =

American novelist (1891–1946)

Lyle Saxon (September 4, 1891 – April 9, 1946) was a writer and journalist who reported for The Times-Picayune in New Orleans, Louisiana. He directed the Federal Writers' Project Works Progress Administration (WPA) guide to Louisiana. He wrote stories and several books including a novel set among the Creoles who lived along the Cane River, a book on New Orleans, a book about pirate Jean Lafitte, and a book about the Great Mississippi Flood of 1927, and co-authored a book on Louisiana folk tales. His book The Friends of Joe Gilmore is about his experiences and friendship with his black valet. Writer, suffragette, poet, and abolitionist Elizabeth Lyle Saxon was his grandmother. Saxon was gay and had an active social life including with various authors.

== Life ==
Saxon was born on September 4, 1891, either in Baton Rouge, Louisiana, or in New Whatcom, Washington, now incorporated into Bellingham, Washington, while his mother was traveling away from home; the early history of his life is "as evasive as the histories that frustrated Saxon in writing Old Louisiana". The confusion is based on Saxon's alleging he was born in Baton Rouge, but his birth certificate stating New Whatcom, Washington.

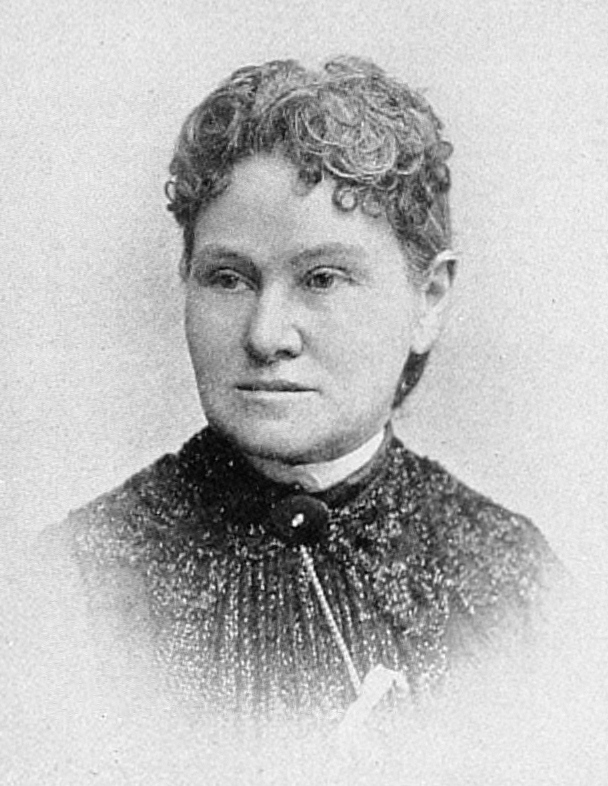
Elizabeth Lyle Saxon

It is possible that his parents, from distinguished families with connections to Baton Rouge and New Orleans, were unmarried, although the birth certificate lists the birth as "legitimate"; Saxon said little about his background and early years, and never met his father. He was raised, however, in Baton Rouge, and made frequent trips to New Orleans throughout his early life, where his paternal uncle and grandmother lived.

Saxon moved to New Orleans not long after college in 1914 or 1915 and, after moving again several times, settled there permanently in 1918. Saxon lived in the French Quarter at 612 Royal St. starting in 1918; Sherwood Anderson, William Faulkner, Roark Bradford, and Edmund Wilson visited.

He was an ardent student of the history of New Orleans and wrote six books on the subject. His most popular titles include Fabulous New Orleans, recounting the city's past as set against his memories of his first Mardi Gras during the turn of the 20th century; Gumbo Ya-Ya, a compilation of native folk stories from Louisiana, including the Loup Garou and the LaLaurie House; and Old Louisiana, a local bestseller from its introduction in 1929.

Saxon was an enthusiastic participant in the New Orleans Mardi Gras tradition.

Yet there was in his life, too, much fun. He was a major proponent of masking at Mardi Gras. He describes his 1940 custom thusly: "I was a white rabbit that year—six feet, two inches tall with a skin tight costume of white imitation rabbit fur, a simpering rabbit face, ears two feet long, standing upright and lined with pink satin, a large bow of pink ribbon tied around my neck, and a small bushy tail." When the time came to enter the streets, Saxon climbed into a baby carriage, and [his manservant] Joe [Gilmore] wheeled the infant bunny through the crowd as Saxon drank from a nursing bottle of whisky."

Saxon's fiction included short stories: "Cane River" was published in The Dial magazine edited by Marianne Moore, and "The Centaur Plays Croquet" included in the American Caravan anthology in 1927. Saxon's 1930 novel Lafitte the Pirate was the basis for the 1938 Cecil B. DeMille film The Buccaneer. His 1937 novel Children of Strangers sold well.

He was a director to the Federal Writers' Project, WPA guide to Louisiana.

He is buried at Magnolia Cemetery in Baton Rouge.

External images
- Photographs related to Lyle Saxon
- Photo of Saxon, as seen on Flickr
- Saxon's signature, as seen on Flickr
- Photo of Saxon, as part of Saxon's biography published by 64 Parishes

== Bibliography ==
- Audubon, John James; De Caro, F.A.; Jordan, Rosan A., eds. (1998). "A Journey Through Mardi Gras". Louisiana sojourns: travelers' tales and literary journeys. Baton Rouge, Louisiana: LSU Press. ISBN 978-0-8071-2240-2.
- Father Mississippi: The Story of the Great Flood of 1927. Gretna, Louisiana: Pelican Publishing Co. 1927. reprint 2006
- Fabulous New Orleans. Gretna, Louisiana: Pelican Publishing Co. 1928. reprint 1988
- Old Louisiana. Gretna, Louisiana: Pelican Publishing Co. 1929. reprint 1989
- Lafitte the Pirate. Gretna, Louisiana: Pelican Publishing Co. 1930. "Lyle Saxon." reprint 1989
- Children of Strangers (novel). Gretna, Louisiana: Pelican Publishing Co. 1937. reprint 1989
- Saxon, Lyle; Dreyer, Edward; Tallant, Robert, eds. (1945). Gumbo Ya-Ya. Gretna, Louisiana: Pelican Publishing Co. reprint 1987
- The Friends of Joe Gilmore. New York City, New York: Hastings House Publishers. 1948.

== See also ==
- George Washington Cable, an earlier writer whose novels featured Creoles

== Sources ==
- Chance, Harvey (2003). The Life and Selected Letters of Lyle Saxon. Gretna, Louisiana: Pelican Publishing Co. ISBN 9781589801097.
- Powell, Lawrence N. (29 July 2009). "Lyle Saxon and the WPA Guide to New Orleans". Southern Spaces. doi:10.18737/M7F60N.
- Thomas, James W. (1991). Lyle Saxon: A Critical Biography. Vestavia Hills, Alabama: Summa Publications Inc. ISBN 978-0-917786-83-9.
