= Rowland J. Darnell House =

Historic house in Tennessee, United States

- U.S. National Register of Historic Places
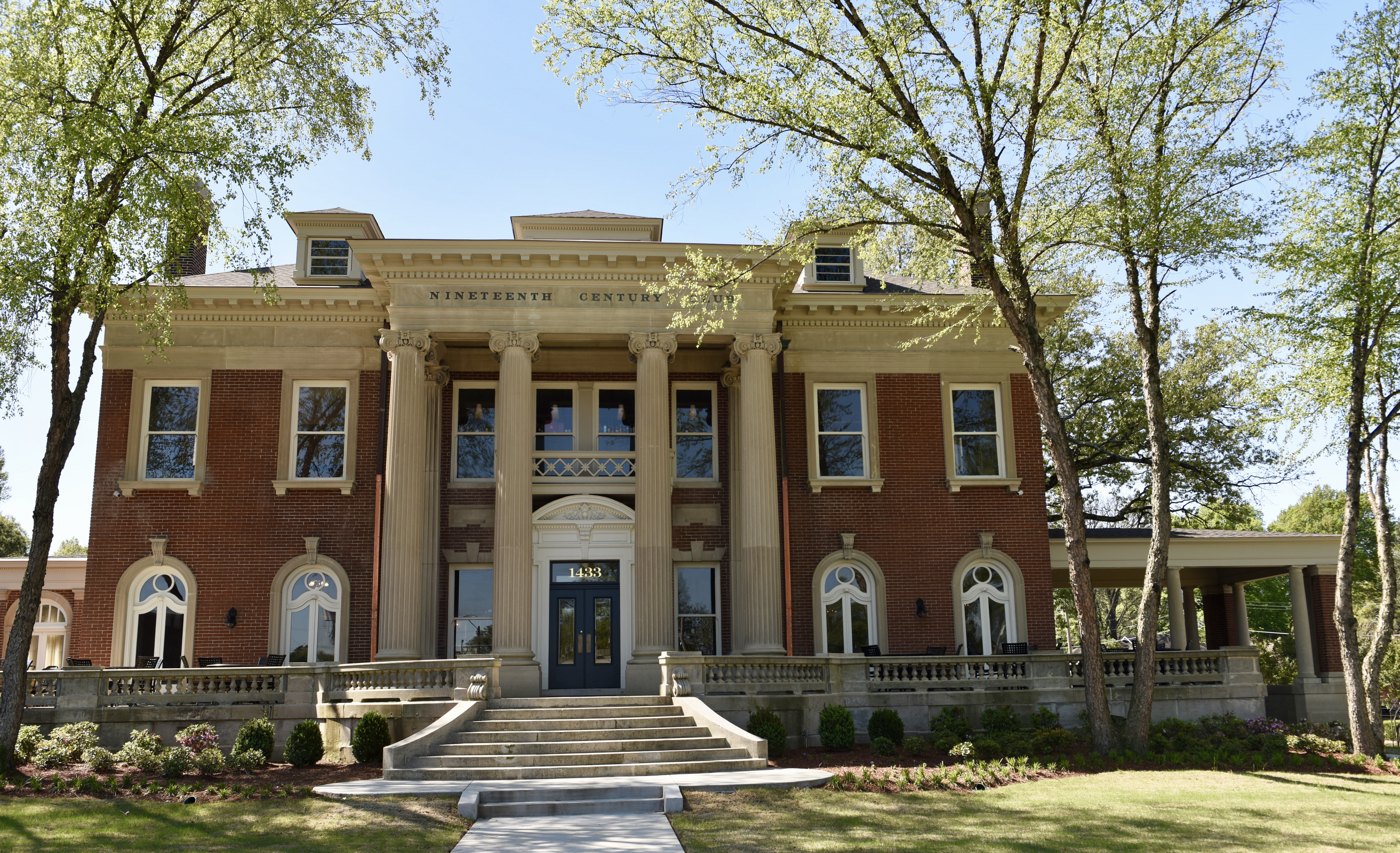
- The Rowland J. Darnell House in 2017

- Location within Tennessee Location within the United States
- Location: 1433 Union Avenue, Memphis, Tennessee
- Coordinates: 35°8′10″N 90°0′49″W
- Area: 1.1 acres (0.45 ha)
- Built: 1907
- Architectural style: Colonial Revival, Beaux Arts
- NRHP reference No.: 79002466
- Added to NRHP: March 26, 1979

The Rowland J. Darnell House is a historic mansion in Memphis, Tennessee, United States. It was built in 1907 for Rowland Jones Darnell, a lumber dealer from the North. By 1917, it had been acquired by the hardware dealer A. R. Orgill, followed by another hardware dealer named Leslie Martin Stratton from 1919 to 1924. It was purchased by The Nineteenth Century Club in 1926.

The house was designed in the Colonial Revival architectural style, with Beaux Arts features. It has been listed on the National Register of Historic Places since March 26, 1979.
