= Italian Hill Town (Arthur B. Davies) =

Painting by Arthur B. Davies

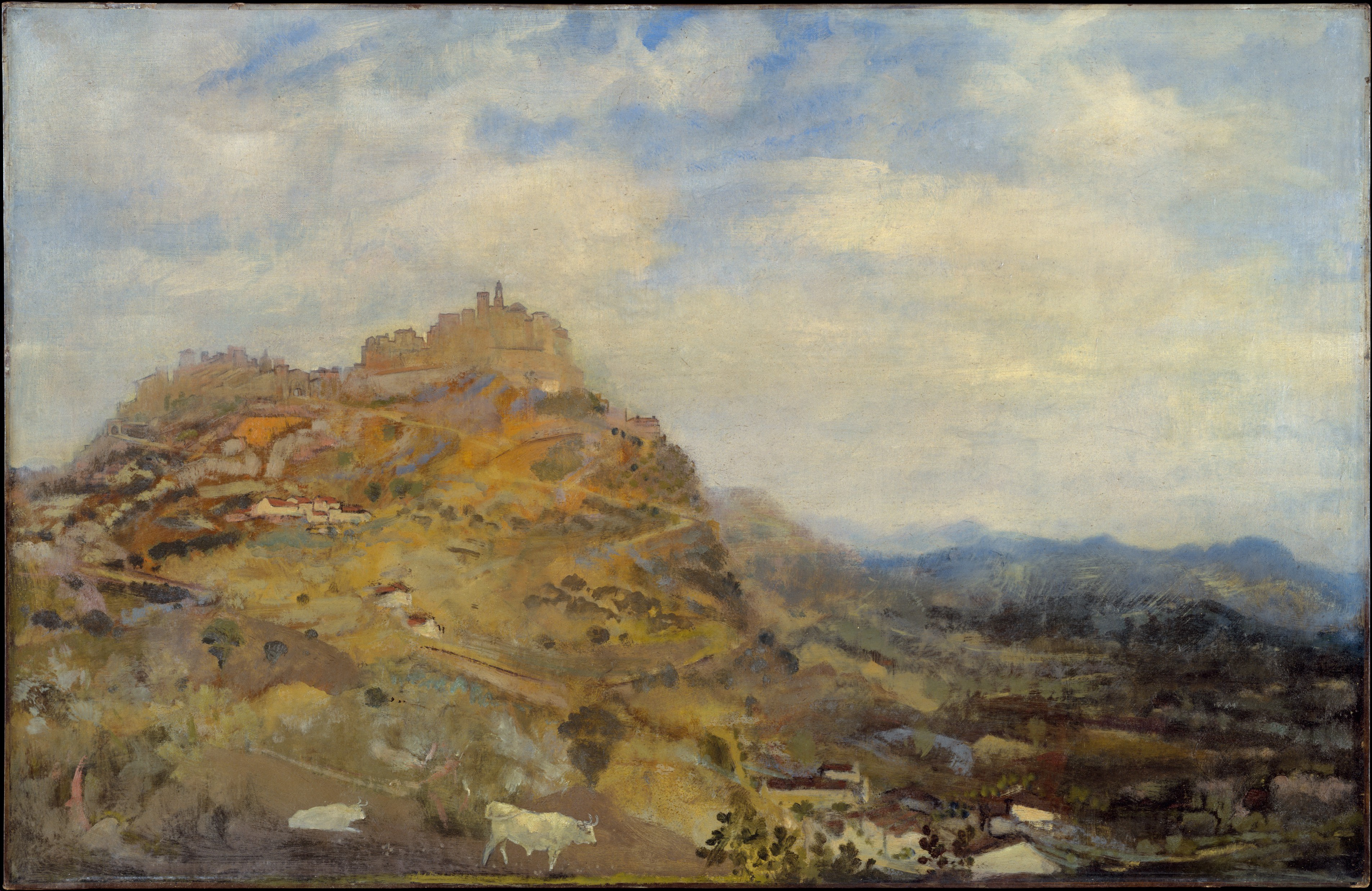
- Artist: Arthur B. Davies
- Year: c. 1925
- Medium: Oil on canvas
- Dimensions: 65.7 cm × 101.3 cm (25.9 in × 39.9 in)
- Location: Metropolitan Museum of Art; New York City
- Accession: 31.67.3

Italian Hill Town is an early 20th century oil on canvas painting by American artist Arthur B. Davies. It depicts a town set on a hillside in Italy (such towns are commonly referred to as Italian Hilltowns).

Davies was a frequent visitor to Italy, especially after 1923, when he was in poor health and found it beneficial. He died there in 1928.

The painting is on display at the Metropolitan Museum of Art in Gallery 774.
