= Clara Conway =

American educator (1844–1904)

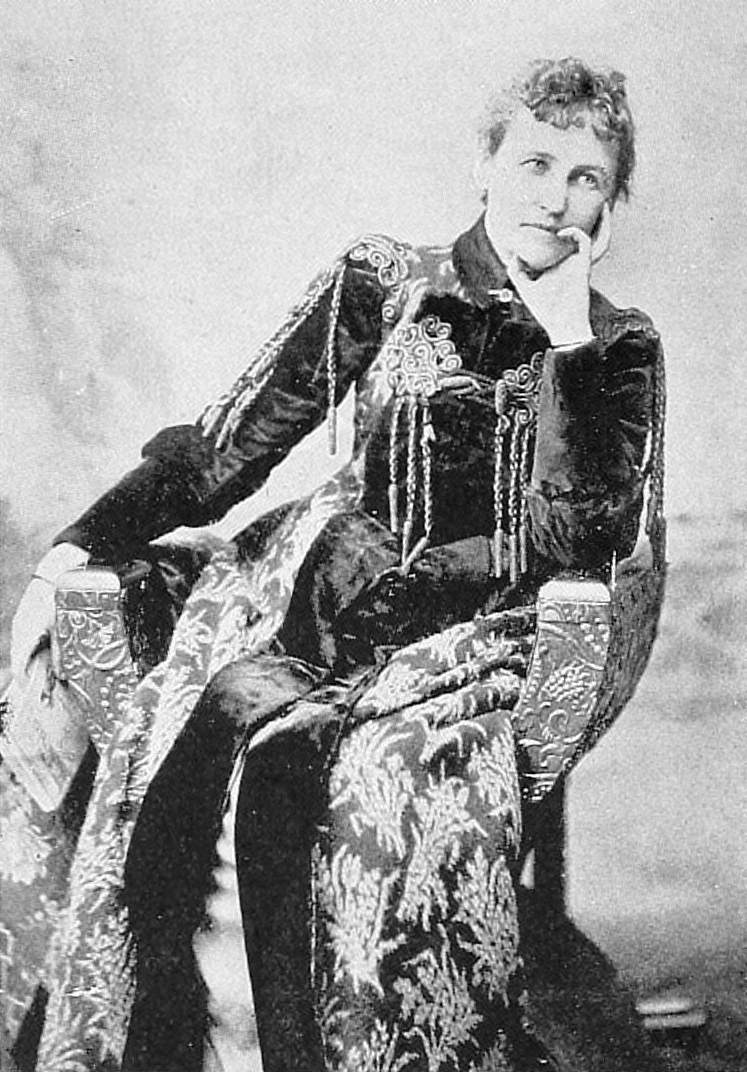
- Born: August 14, 1844; New Orleans, Louisiana
- Died: November 16, 1904 (aged 60); Memphis, Tennessee
- Resting place: Calvary Cemetery
- Occupations: Schoolteacher, principal
- Organization: The Nineteenth Century Club
- Known for: Clara Conway Institute

Clara Conway (August 14, 1844 – November 16, 1904) was a Public School Teacher, School Administrator in the Memphis School district and an early woman's political activist. She founded the Clara Conway Institute for Girls in Memphis, Tennessee and an application was granted for chartership 1 June 1885 and was a founding member of the Nineteenth Century Club in 1890.

== Early life ==
Clara Conway was born in New Orleans, Louisiana on August 14, 1844. She attended the St. Agnes Academy in Memphis, but received most of her education at home. She moved to Memphis, Tennessee in 1864.

She began her career at the age of twenty-one as a public school teacher. Developing a strong interest in providing women with a quality education, also, she was the first of many Tennessee woman to assist in the organization of teachers' institutes, and the first southern woman to attend the teachers' summer school in the North, when she took classes at the first session of Martha's Vineyard Summer Institute in Cottage City, Mass. in 1878.

She later became the principal of the Alabama Street School and the Market Street School. In 1873, She was asked to become superintendent of public schools systems in Memphis as part of a political struggle to have female educators recognized for their merits. Clara did not get the position and female educators did not receive equal pay, but the controversial event was a critical moment connecting female empowerment to the larger community.

Clara remained heavily involved in educational issues for women, speaking publicly at the National Educational Association in Madison, Wisconsin, on the needs of southern women in 1884 and 1886, and in 1887 she was elected a member of the National Council.

== Political activism ==
Clara's brand of activism was loosely based on maternalism than much of women's political activism of the time period. Her activism was motivated by women's independence. Conway argued that a woman's duty is first and foremost to herself, not to her husband, which was a common viewpoint even among female activists.

In 1889, She and Nellie O'Donnell, a newly elected female school superintendent, traveled to Nashville to personally face sexist male legislators who had introduced bills prohibiting women from becoming superintendents. Scores of female educators and prominent citizens rallied to support the women, and the bill was defeated. Instead, a bill was passed confirming women's eligibility as school superintendents.

In May 1890, She was among a group of strong female women that had the desire in educating girls to attain quality moral principles in the city of Memphis, she founded the Nineteenth Century Club, a women's club that aimed to improve the city's lifestyle and public services.

== Clara Conway Institute ==
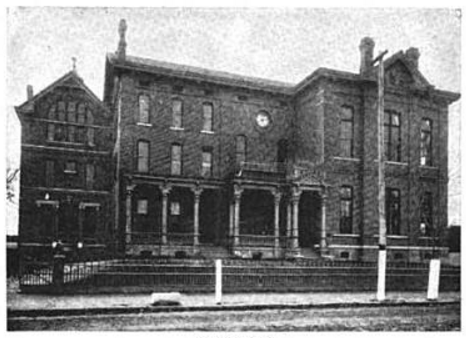
The Clara Conway Institute in 1891

In 1878, Conway left to open a private high school for girls. The school began with only 50 pupils and one assistant, and the growth of its attendance was remarketable. Her idea was to teach the principles of absolute thoroughness and establish a system of education that would help girls, if conditions made self-support necessary become economically independent through a solid foundation of education. She believed that by acquiring an education, women could "take part in the work of the world and would be able to attain professional careers." She explained, "The stale, worn-out argument that higher education detracts from womanliness has lost its force... Everywhere one sees high bred women in careers. Independence is one of the highest attributes of womanhood.

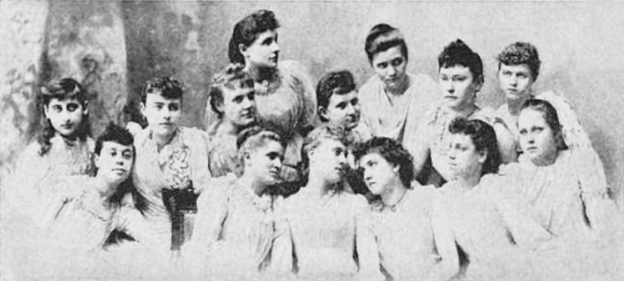
The Conway Institute Class of 1891

By 1884, the school had expanded to 250 pupils, leading to the need for a permanent location, incorporation of the school's charter and its naming of the Clara Conway Institute after its founder. The Board of Trustees included some of the most influential businessmen in the city, and by 1888, the school had over 300 young women enrolled and 26 faculty members. The school became known for its progressive and innovative approach to education, and included a fine reference library, a gymnasium, a science lab, and a complete arts studio. Courses included voice, piano, theory, and public speaking. The school also operated a kindergarten program in Memphis, first established at the Market Street location, in 1872. She incorporated in to her school. The school became a major college preparatory school for young women. The school closed in 1893 over a disagreement between her ambitions and trustees needs. The financial backers thought she aimed too high for her graduates.

== Later life ==
After the closure of the school, Clara helped organize the General Federation of Women's Clubs, in Knoxville, a council of women, representing several different women's organizations, with the goal in mind of creating a woman's southern college that would be equal to the northern academic schools like Vassar or Wellesley. She spent the later years of her life teaching, speaking out for woman rights and campaigning for women's higher education at the local, state and national level until her untimely death in 1904.

== Legacy ==
Clara Conway's influence on her students continued years after her death. One student described her as thus:

Once in a generation, there is born one who envisions conditions as they should be - a dreamer, innovator and influencer. Such as this, was Clara Conway... To most of us she sat Minerva-like upon a mystic throne - incomparably wise, brilliant and resourceful, impressing upon each one who passed within the space of her influence the importance of her motto. "Neglect not the gift that is within thee," or that other motto she loved so well, "Influence is responsibility."

The latter motto eventually was adopted by the Nineteenth Century Club that Clara helped found.

After Clara's death in 1904, the Clara Conway Alumnae Association constructed the Clara Conway Memorial Pergola on the grounds of Overton Park in Memphis, Tennessee. One of the three original elements of Overton Park, the structure was destroyed in a 1936 storm.
