= Elizabeth Lyle Saxon =

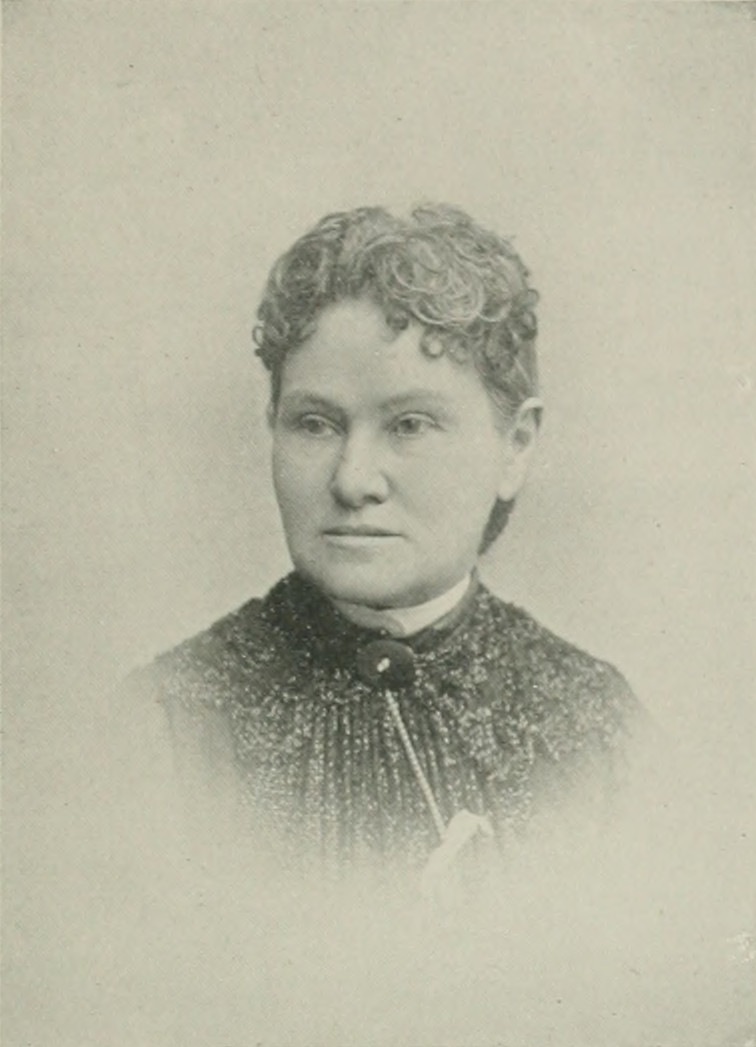
- Born: Elizabeth Lyle; December 2, 1832; Greenville, Tennessee
- Died: March 14, 1915 (aged 82); Memphis, Tennessee
- Known for: Women's Suffrage Movement
- Notable work: A Southern Woman's War Time Reminiscences

Elizabeth Lyle Saxon (December 2, 1832 – March 14, 1915) was a writer and a late 19th and early 20th century advocate of women's rights. She reached national recognition as one of the key pioneer suffragettes of the South, making numerous appeals to the federal government to recognize women's right to vote.

== Early life ==
Elizabeth Lyle Saxon was born December 2, 1832, to Andrew J. Lyle and Clarissa N. Crutchfield in Greenville, Tennessee. When Saxon was only two years old, her mother died, leaving her father to raise her alone. Saxon very much looked up to her father and described herself as being like him. He passed on to her a love of literature and nature, and "hatred of oppression". In her youth, Saxon was formally tutored by writer Caroline Lee Hentz in Tuskegee, Alabama. Saxon began writing at the age of 12 under the pen name Annott Lyle and later published stories in the Louisville, Kentucky, Courier; the Columbia, South Carolina, Banner; and the Philadelphia Courier. At the age of 16, she married South Carolinian Lydell A. Saxon and together they had four children who survived to adulthood.

== Civil War ==
In 1855, Saxon and her family spent the winters in Wetumpka, Alabama and summers in New York City, where her husband traveled for business. In 1860, tensions between the North and the South were growing, and Saxon traveled to Savannah, where she noted a buzz in anticipation of the American Civil War. Saxon's husband had strong Union sentiments which made him unpopular, and he returned to New York while Saxon remained in Memphis with their two children. On an 1861 trip to New Orleans just before the start of the war, Saxon had a dream of her father's death, and she fell into despair when she could not contact him in Arkansas, where he had traveled with her brothers. She returned to Alabama just as the war began. Alabama seceded on January 11, 1861, a day that Saxon described as the saddest in her life. She and her husband were unionists, and she hated slavery, but she remained in Alabama, describing herself as "Southern in every vein and fibre of being." As the war progressed, Saxon became a "Southern Mother", working day and night for suffering soldiers.

By 1863, news of significant Confederate losses reached Saxon, and she resolved to track down her father. Since the trip would involve leaving the Confederacy, she first secured a pass from the governor and exchanged her Confederate currency for gold. She reached Memphis, which by then was in Union territory, but was unable to secure another pass to travel further. Instead she boarded a steamer in effort to travel to New York to join her husband. There, she met a woman who knew Saxon's father and reported that he was gravely ill the Irving Block prison in Memphis, where he was being held as a Confederate spy. Saxon immediately returned to Memphis and arranged for his release. He died shortly after, and on his death-bed had Saxon promise him "never to cease working for unfortunate women, so long as her life should last." She remained in Memphis for two years, and was also accused of being a spy for the Confederacy, although she was not formally charged.

In 1905, Saxon published her Civil War memoir, A Southern Woman's War Time Reminiscences.

== Women's suffrage ==
Although an accomplished writer, she rose to national recognition for her efforts in the women's suffrage movement. For Saxon, the key to women's future lay with voting rights and economic opportunity. In 1878, she was elected president of the Ladies Physiological Association and in 1879 she helped New Orleans suffragettes promote a successful voting rights petition.

That same year, Saxon spoke before the Louisiana Constitutional Convention, where a motion was made to give women equal voting rights. The speech was published in the June 17th, 1879 issue of the New Orleans Times. A moving orator, she also spoke before the U.S. Senate's Judiciary Committee and traveled with women's rights activist Susan B. Anthony on a tour of New England. She quickly developed a national reputation as a poetic and impassioned speaker.

Saxon served as state president of the Tennessee Suffrage Association and vice president of the Women's National Suffrage Association. She spoke on behalf of the National Prohibition Alliance and delivered a speech to more than 5,000 women at a meeting of the International Council of Women on Social Purity in Washington, D.C.

== Later life ==
In 1864, Saxon's husband returned to join her in Memphis. After the war ended, the Saxon family moved to New Orleans, and their third child, Hugh, was born. Saxon then divided her time between New Orleans and Memphis, becoming immersed in reform work in both cities. Saxon's husband died in 1901.

Saxon later traveled west to Washington state, founding a settlement and a public library. She eventually returned to Memphis, where she died on March 14, 1915.

== Legacy ==
Saxon died 5 years before the ratification of the Nineteenth Amendment, which gave American women the right to vote. However, her work was instrumental to the social changes leading up to the amendment's passing, and she left behind a lasting legacy as an activist, writer, and woman of the South. Virginius Dabney's study, Liberalism in the South, lists Saxon as one of the most important suffragist leaders of her day. Saxon's grandson, Lyle Saxon, became a prolific writer on New Orleans, Louisiana, and Southern folklore.
