= The Nineteenth Century Club =

Memphis, Tennessee-based women's club

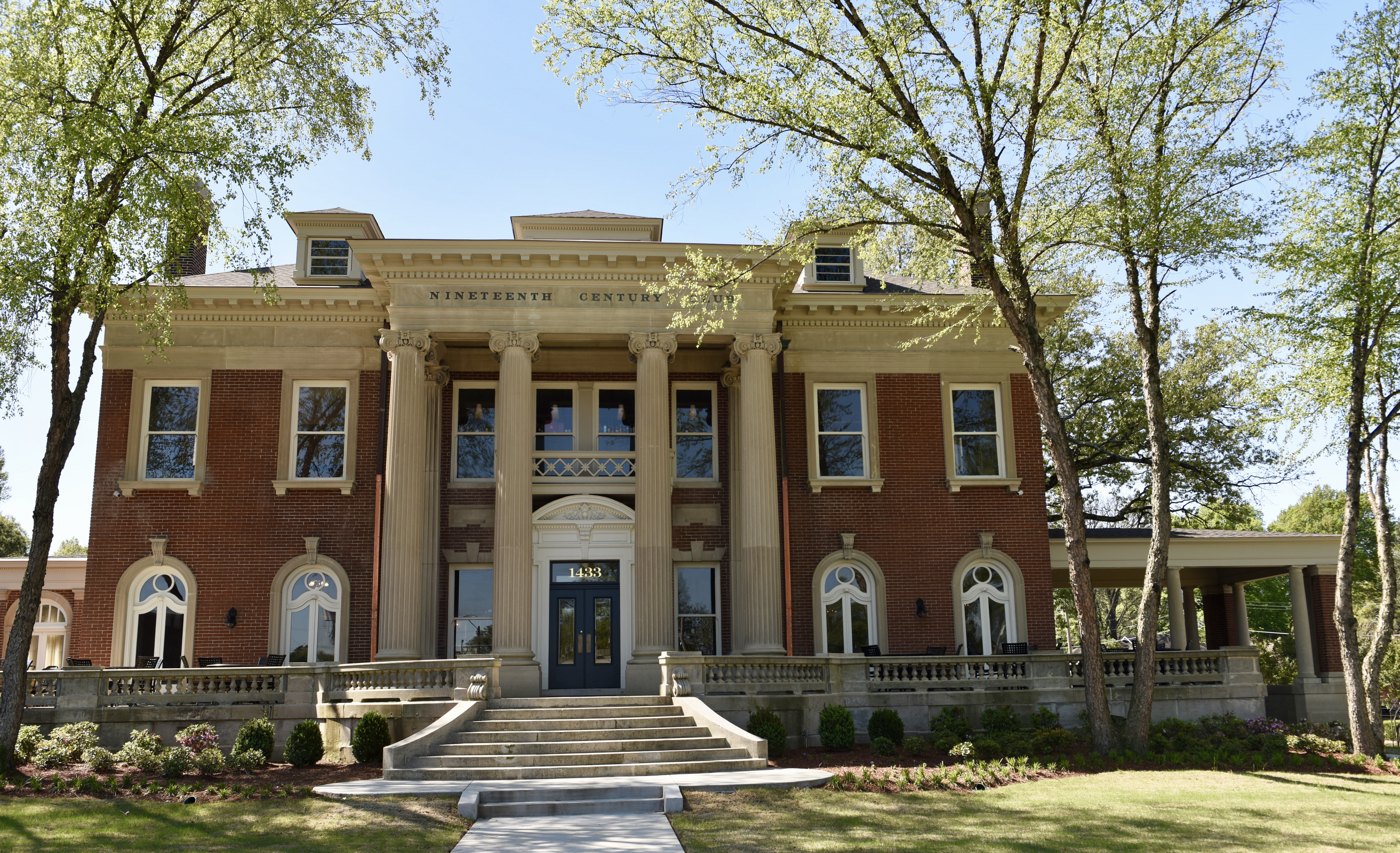
The Nineteenth Century Club, in the historic Rowland J. Darnell House.

The Nineteenth Century Club is a historic philanthropic and cultural women's club based in Memphis, Tennessee. The Nineteenth Century Club adopted the idea that the community was an extended "household" that would benefit from the "gentler spirit" and "uplifting influence" of women, and shifted towards civic reform. The club primarily focused on the needs of women and children, addressing public problems such as sanitation, health, education, employment, and labor conditions.

== Creation ==
The club was founded in May 1890 following an assembly of elite white women at the Gayoso Hotel in Memphis. The founding members included the women activists Elise Massey Selden, Elizabeth Fisher Johnson, Elizabeth Avery Meriwether, Elizabeth Lyle Saxon, Clara Conway, and Lide Meriwether. The stated objectives of the club were "to promote the female intellect by encouraging a spirit of research in literary fields and provide an intellectual center for the women of Memphis." The club was immediately successful, with membership steadily rising and peaking at around 1,400 members in 1926.

== Political activism ==
In 1891, one of the four committees in the club was "Philanthropy and Reform", which attempted to influence Memphis officials. The members wanted to participate in the development of the city and inject women's "gentler spirit" and more "loving wisdom" into municipal affairs. While the activities of the club empowered female influence in politics, members made many assurances that the goal was not radical political upheaval, cautioning against ambition and arguing that activism made was merely "housekeeping" that was extended to the "family" of the city community.

The activism promoted by the club was described as a very selfless and feminine brand of activism. Despite the many disclaimers, the movement did signal a "new sense of power and capacity among American women", particularly in the South. The club motto was "Influence is Responsibility", which epitomized their feelings of accountability for society.

In 1892, the Congress of the Association for the Advancement of Women met for the first time in a southern city at its 20th annual meeting with the Nineteenth Century Club. Founding member Clara Conway made the opening remarks, stating that women "were impatient with incompleteness" and were eager to move away from leisure to become productive members of society.

== Campaigns ==
Successful campaigns secured a police matron at the city jail, established a female sanitary inspector at the Board of Health, formed the Shelby County Anti-Tuberculosis Society, and founded a new city hospital. They also played an important role in the West Tennessee State Normal School, which later came to be known as the University of Memphis.

In 1897, the Hamburg branch of the club established the Hamburg Public Library in an effort to enrich the community and improve education. At that time, the club had limited membership of 19 women, including several librarians and teachers. In 1901, the Hamburg Business Men's Club took over management of the library and formed the Library Association. The New York State Education Department chartered the library in 1902, and it remains open.

== Modern day ==
The club remains in existence. In 1926, the club acquired a mansion built in 1906 by Rowland Darnell, a great lumber magnate of Memphis, and remained there for over 20 years. The mansion was eventually sold as membership continued to decline over the years. A legal battle took place over ownership and historical preservation of the mansion, eventually resulting in a restoration and conversion into a restaurant.
