= Print Connoisseur =

Defunct Quarterly Publication

The Print Connoisseur: A Quarterly Magazine for the Print Collector was a quarterly periodical published from 1920 to 1932 by Winfred Porter Truesdell of New York City.

Starting with Volume 1, No. 1 (October 1920) it lasted through 46 issues to Volume 12, No. 2 (1932). Most issues contained at least one original print as the frontispiece. Original prints were done by leading American and European artists including: John Taylor Arms, Frank W. Benson, George Elmer Burr, Emil Fuchs, Arthur William Heintzelman, Norman Kent, Paul Landacre, J. J. Lankes, Frederick Reynolds, Howard Simon, Birger Sandzén, Lynd Ward, and others.

The periodical appeared in different versions:

- issued quarterly in wraps (paper covers.) This allowed some subscribers to have their copies privately bound. The cover design could change from quarter to quarter. In some cases, the same issue could come out in different cover colors.
- at the end of the year a subscriber could order a bound version from the publisher.
- a limited edition (need to get more information to estimate the edition size) that had some signed prints. In other cases the limited edition had a frontispiece that was different from the regular edition e.g. an Arms print was done in colours for the limited edition but just black & white in the regular edition. In another case the limited edition got a drypoint but since the plate wouldn't stand up, the regular edition only got a reproduction.

In 2006 a complete index was published by Alan Wofsy Fine Arts.
