= Irving Block prison =

American Civil War prison in Memphis, Tennessee

Coordinates: 35.1462°N 90.0508°W

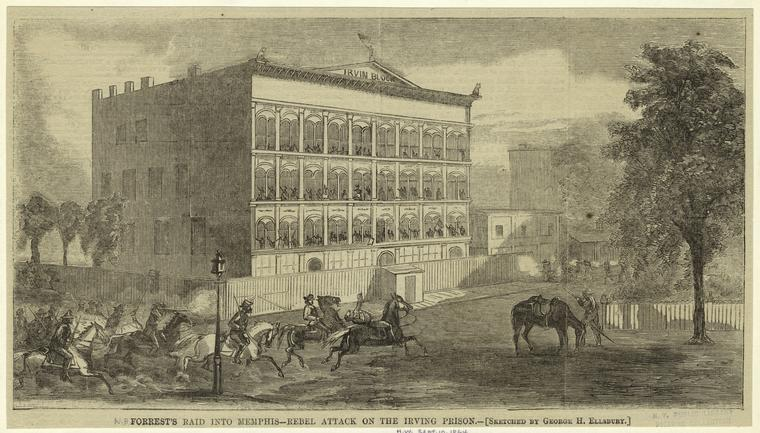
Attack on Irving Block by General Forrest in 1864

The Irving Block prison was a wartime prison in Memphis, Tennessee, during the American Civil War. Notorious for its cruel and unsanitary living conditions, it was also known as the "Bastille" of Memphis.

== Creation ==
The building that later became used as the Irving Block Prison was constructed in 1860 on Second Street in Memphis, as an office building. To protect the building from burglary, iron slats covered the windows. During the Civil War, it was converted into a Confederate Hospital by the Southern Mothers organization. After the capture of Memphis by the Union Army in 1862, it was turned into a prison to house soldiers and civilian Confederate sympathizers, including women and Memphis mayor John Park.

== Extortion ==
In 1862, General Ulysses S. Grant appointed Stephen A. Hurlbut in charge of Memphis and the Irving Block prison. Hurlbut had been instructed to crack down on Confederate sympathizers and the smuggling of cotton, but instead set up an extortion ring to profit from the turmoil in the city. Hurlbut also began extorting money from Memphis merchants, imprisoning them in Irving Block on false charges of espionage and demanding exorbitant bond fees, then never calling the accused to return to court, keeping the bond or sometimes finding them guilty in absentia as an excuse to confiscate the rest of their property.

Hurlbut appointed Captain George A. Williams prison commandant in 1863, and together they expanded the extortion ring to include the commanding officers at the Irving Block prison. Williams was emboldened by their success, demanding ransoms from wealthy residents who sought to release captive soldiers from confinement at the prison. John Hallum, a Memphis lawyer, wrote publicly about Hulbut and Williams' crimes and uncovered a scandal involving Hurlbut, making him a liability to Hurlbut's operation. Hallum was arrested and confined at Fort Pickering, where he nearly died from the deteriorating conditions. The notoriety surrounding Hallum's arrest brought about a War Department inspection of Irving Block in 1864.

== Conditions ==
As the war intensified, the situation grew worse, and some prisoners remained in chains for months at a time, receiving little food or medical attention. Complaints about the conditions in the prison prompted an investigation by Judge Advocate General Joseph Holt, who wrote President Abraham Lincoln in April 1864 that Lt. Col. John F. Marsh found the prison conditions to be unacceptable. The report detailed Marsh's first hand account of the prison, stating:

The prison which is used for the detention of citizens, prisoners of war on their way to the North, and the United States soldiers awaiting trial and which is located in a large block of stores is represented as the filthiest place the inspector ever saw occupied by human beings. The whole management and government of the prison could not be worse! Discipline and order are unknown. Food sufficient but badly served. In a dark wet cellar I found twenty-eight prisoners chained to a wet floor, where they had been constantly confined, many of them for several months, one since November 16, 1863, and are not for a moment released even to relieve the calls of nature. With a single exception these men have had no trial.

In April 1864, an officer reported to War Secretary Edwin Stanton of the shockingly inhuman conditions that the prisoners were kept in, leading to Stanton dismissing Captain Williams from his post. However, General Grant intervened on Williams' behalf, and Williams was reinstated as prison commandant. After Williams returned to the prison, and after the removal of Hurlbut from command, Williams dissolved the extortion ring and resolved to clean up the prison. In July 1864, the prison was officially designated a U.S. Military Prison.

== Raid on Memphis ==
During the war, Confederate Major General Nathan Bedford Forrest became determined to free the prisoners from Irving Block, and led a raid on Memphis in August 1864 to accomplish this goal and free captured Confederate Generals. He didn't find the generals, although one did manage to escape during the night with 500 other prisoners, and he was successful in influencing Union forces to return to Memphis from northern Mississippi.

== Closure ==
The prison was so notorious that it was eventually closed by order of President Lincoln himself in 1865. At that time the prison held about 1200 soldiers and 100 citizens. The building was condemned and demolished during the Great Depression in 1937.
