= Nashville Board of Parks and Recreation =

Metropolitan Board of Parks and Recreation

Agency overview
- Jurisdiction: Nashville, Tennessee, United States
- Headquarters: 2565 Park Plaza Nashville, Tennessee, United States
- Agency executives: George Anderson, Chairperson; Stan Fossick, Vice-Chairperson; Monique Odom, Parks Director
- Parent agency: Nashville, Tennessee
- Website: http://www.nashville.gov/parks/

The Nashville Metropolitan Board of Parks and Recreation (also known as Metro Parks and Recreation or Nashville Parks and Recreation) is a municipal board that is responsible for maintaining the parks system of Nashville, Tennessee, United States, and furnishing recreational opportunities for city's residents. The board maintains over 10,710 acres (4,330 ha) of park space. The Board is responsible for over 100 stand-alone parks and 7 municipal golf courses. The ParkScore index is a national comparison of park systems scored on five categories; in 2024, Nashville and Davidson County's parks ranked 78th out of the 100 most populous cities in the U.S.

== History ==
In 1901, Nashville Mayor James Marshall Head created the Nashville Parks Board. The plan was to create several neighborhood parks and four larger parks of about 50 acres (0.078 mi^{2}), one built in each quadrant of town. Nashville's first park, Watkins Park, was created in 1909. During his two terms as mayor, Head also negotiated the city's acquisition of 72 acres (0.113 mi^{2}) of prime land that had been used in 1897 for the Tennessee Centennial Exposition. The site became known as Centennial Park.

== Administration ==
The Park Board has seven members, appointed for five year terms. As of 2025, the board is composed of:

- Cheryl Mayes- representing the Board of Education
- Shan Foster
- Dr. Michelle Steele, "chair"
- William (Pete) Delay
- Susannah Scott-Barnes
- Edward Henley- representing the Planning Commission
- Crews Johnston

As of 2025, the Parks Director, who oversees day-to-day operations, is Monique Odom.

Divisions of the Parks Department include Maintenance, Planning, Recreation and Community Centers, Special Services, Natural Resources and Greenways, and Park Police.

== Attractions ==
Nashville Parks' most notable attraction is the Parthenon, based in Centennial Park. The structure is a full-scale replica of the original Parthenon in Athens. It was originally built in 1897 for the Tennessee Centennial Exposition.

Nashville Parks also runs the nearby Centennial Sports Complex, which has an Olympic-sized pool, an ice rink, and a workout area. The Complex rink is home to the Nashville Predators's practice facilities.

Four of Nashville's major parks lie within Nashville's Highland Rim Forest, part of the largest remaining contiguous forest habitat regions in middle Tennessee. These parks are Beaman Park, Bells Bend Park, Warner Parks, and Radnor Lake State Park.

== See also ==
- Shelby Park
- Warner Parks, home of the annual running of the Iroquois Steeplechase, Tennessee's only graded stakes race.
