= Eugene C. Lewis =

American engineer (1845–1917)

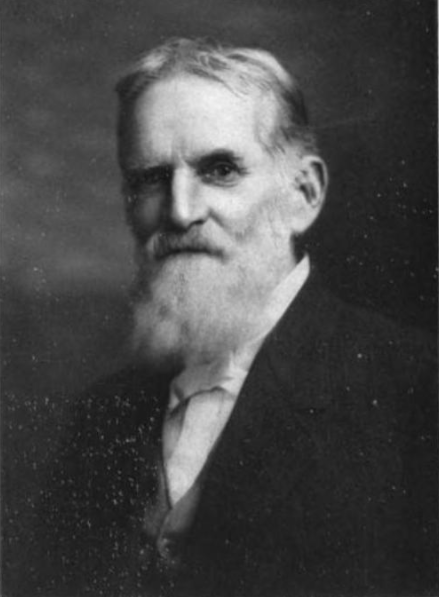
- Born: Eugene Castner Lewis; June 21, 1845; Cumberland Iron Works, Tennessee
- Died: February 13, 1917 (aged 71); Nashville, Tennessee
- Resting place: Mount Olivet Cemetery, Nashville
- Education: Pennsylvania Military Academy
- Occupations: Engineer, businessman

Major Eugene Castner Lewis (June 21, 1845 – February 13, 1917) was an American engineer and businessman. He served as the chairman of the Nashville, Chattanooga and St. Louis Railway from 1900 to 1917. As a civic leader, he helped develop Shelby Park and Centennial Park, including the Parthenon, as well as Union Station.

== Early life ==
Eugene C. Lewis was born on June 21, 1845. His father was the manager of the Cumberland Iron Works. Lewis was educated at the Pennsylvania Military Academy, enrolling in 1862, during the American Civil War.

== Business career ==
Lewis began his career as the president of Sycamore Mills in Cheatham County, Tennessee. He also designed at least two bridges over Sycamore Creek in Nashville. Additionally, he was the honorary president of the American Association of Engineers.

Lewis joined the Nashville, Chattanooga and St. Louis Railway as an industrial engineer. He was elected to its board of directors in 1896, and he served as its chairman from 1900 to 1917.

== Civic activities ==
Lewis was appointed as director-general of the Tennessee Centennial Exposition, held a year late in 1897. In particular, he was known to have suggested that a reproduction of the Greek Parthenon be constructed as the centerpiece of Nashville's exhibit and the Exposition. Nashville was nicknamed the "Athens of the South." Its rival Memphis constructed a reproduction of a pyramid. Both exhibits were lit at night and were next to each other on the shore of Lake Watauga.

Lewis supported the retention of the popular Parthenon after the exposition closed. (In the 1920s, it was reconstructed in permanent materials and adapted for use as an art museum in the park.)

The exposition grounds became Centennial Park, which Lewis helped develop along with Shelby Park. Additionally, Lewis helped develop Union Station.

On April 19, 1909, Lewis conducted the dedication of the Sam Davis Statue outside the Tennessee State Capitol.

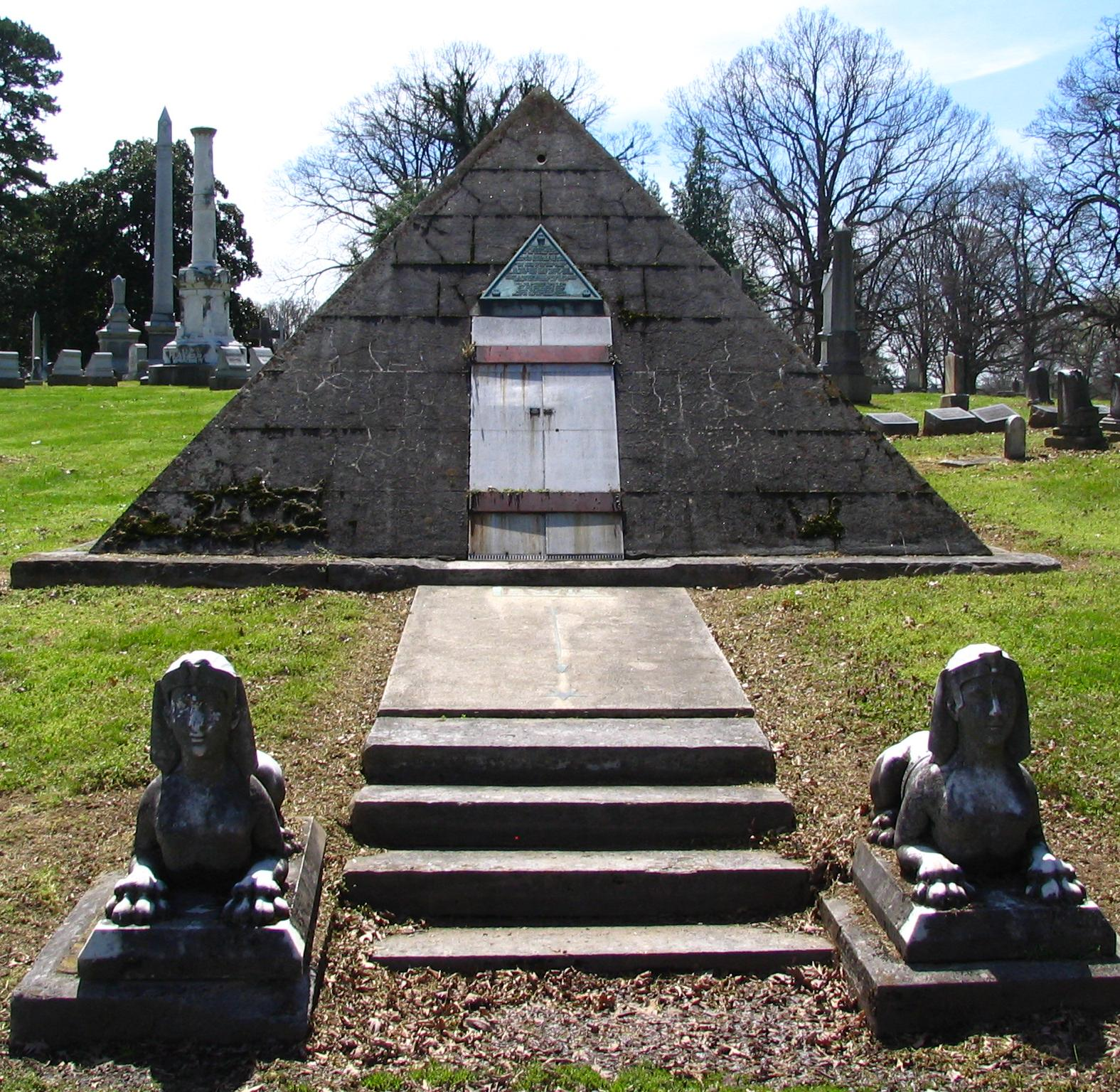
Grave of Major Eugene C. Lewis, Mount Olivet Cemetery

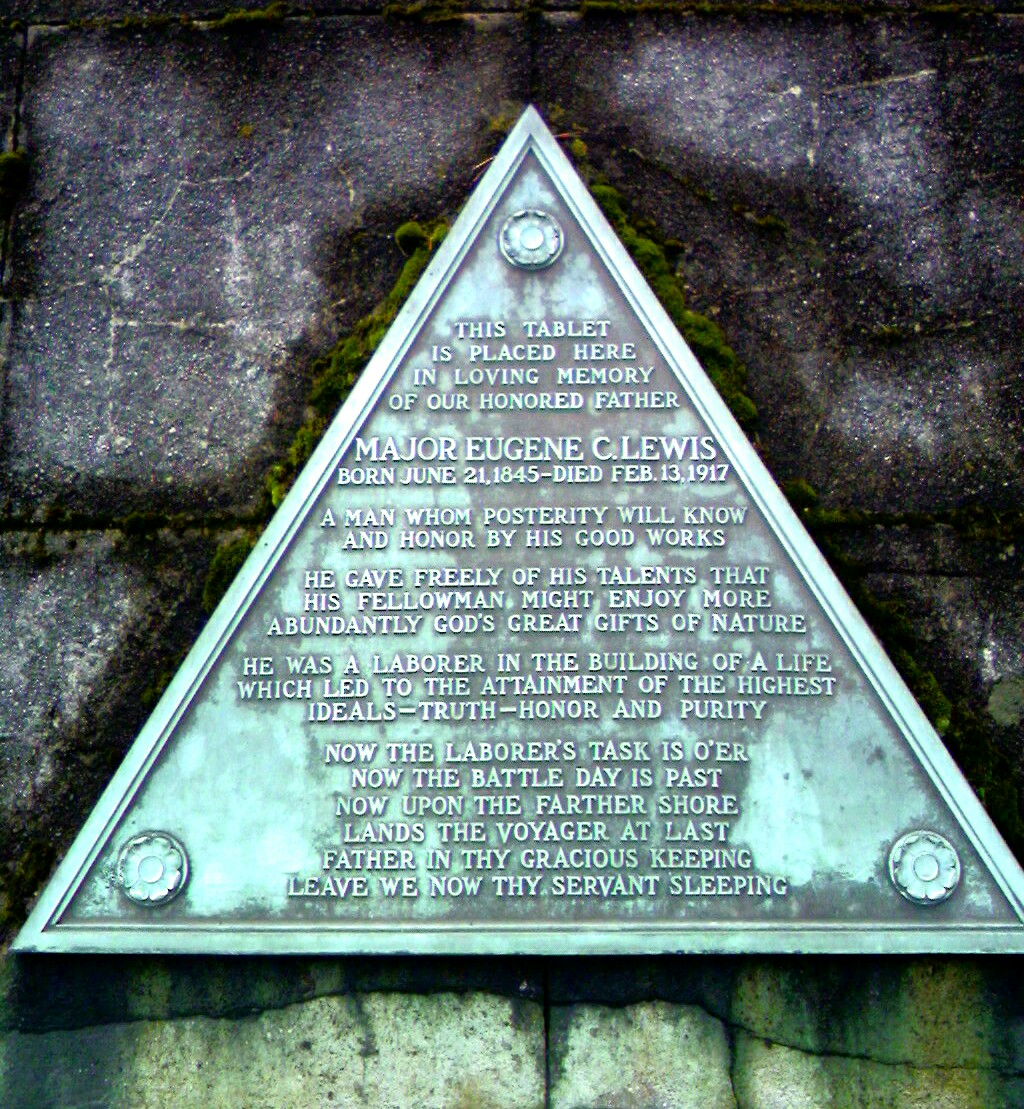
Plaque on mausoleum

Lewis was the first vice president of the Nashville Art Association. He was a member of the Park Commission for the City of Nashville from 1910-1912. In 1916, a lawsuit against city government called him as a witness. His and other testimony showed he had hired his son, his brother, his niece, his second nephew and the latter's son to the park commission while he served on it. This was considered illegal nepotism and patronage. He said some appointments were made by others and he had not been aware.

== Death ==
Lewis died on February 13, 1917, in Nashville. He was buried at Mount Olivet Cemetery, in a mausoleum shaped like an Egyptian pyramid, guarded by two sphinxes.
