= Cornelia Fort Airpark =

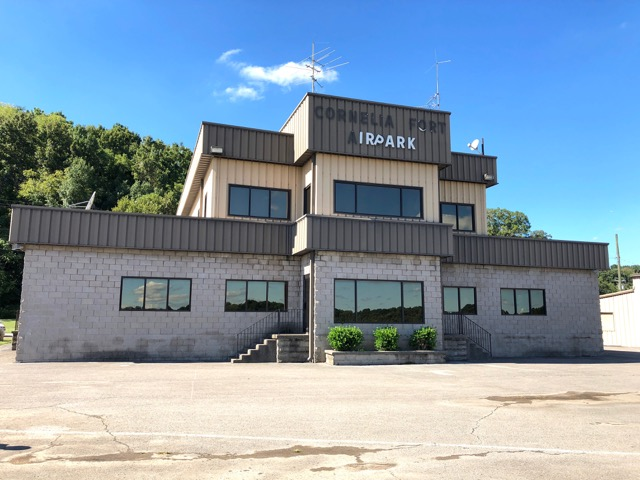
- IATA: none; ICAO: none; FAA LID: M88

Summary
- Airport type: Public (closed)
- Owner: Colemill Enterprises
- Serves: Nashville, Tennessee
- Elevation AMSL: 418 ft / 127 m
- Coordinates: 36°11′25″N 086°41′59″W
- Interactive map of Cornelia Fort Airpark

Runways
Direction	Length		Surface
Direction	ft	m	Surface
4/22 (closed)	3,500	1,067	Asphalt

Statistics (2009)
- Aircraft operations: 30,110
- Based aircraft: 27
- Source: Federal Aviation Administration

Cornelia Fort Airpark (FAA LID: M88) was a privately owned, public-use airport located five nautical miles (9 km) northeast of the central business district of Nashville, in Davidson County, Tennessee, United States. It was located on Cumberland River bottomland. It is named in honor of Nashvillian Cornelia Fort, the first female pilot to be killed on war duty in American history. The airpark was built in 1945 near the Fort family farm. The 141-acre airport was located on part of a plot of land granted to early Nashvillian Ephraim McLean for service in the Revolutionary War, near what is still known as McLean's Bend in the Cumberland River in East Nashville. The airport operated from 1944 until 2011, when the city of Nashville acquired it to include it as non-aviation part of Shelby Park.

== History ==
The land for the air park was leased after WWII by Ernest W. Colbert and Bill Miller, whose names formed the portmanteau "Colemill". They established the Colemill Flying Service and named their airport in honor of World War II aviator Cornelia Fort.

In the early 1950s Colbert bought out his partner to become sole owner and continued in that capacity (operating it as Colemill Enterprises) until selling it in 2011. Colbert was inducted into the Tennessee Aviation Hall of Fame. He had been seeking a buyer after defaulting on loans of $1 million in 2005 and the second for $1.4 million in 2010 after the property was inundated in the 2010 Tennessee floods.

With the 2011 purchase, the Shelby Park/Shelby Bottoms/Cornelia Fort area has more than 1,300 acres—the fourth largest public greenspace in Nashville (trailing Beaman, Bells Bend and Warner). After the sale, the property would no longer be serving small private planes.

On March 5, 1963, country singers Patsy Cline, Hawkshaw Hawkins, and Cowboy Copas were flying into Cornelia Fort Airpark from Fairfax Airport in Kansas City, Kansas. The owner and pilot of the plane was Copas' son in law, and Cline's manager, Randy Hughes. After a stopover at Dyersburg to refuel, Hughes' Piper Comanche crashed on the flight to Nashville near Camden, Tennessee, about 90 miles from the Cornelia Fort Airpark.

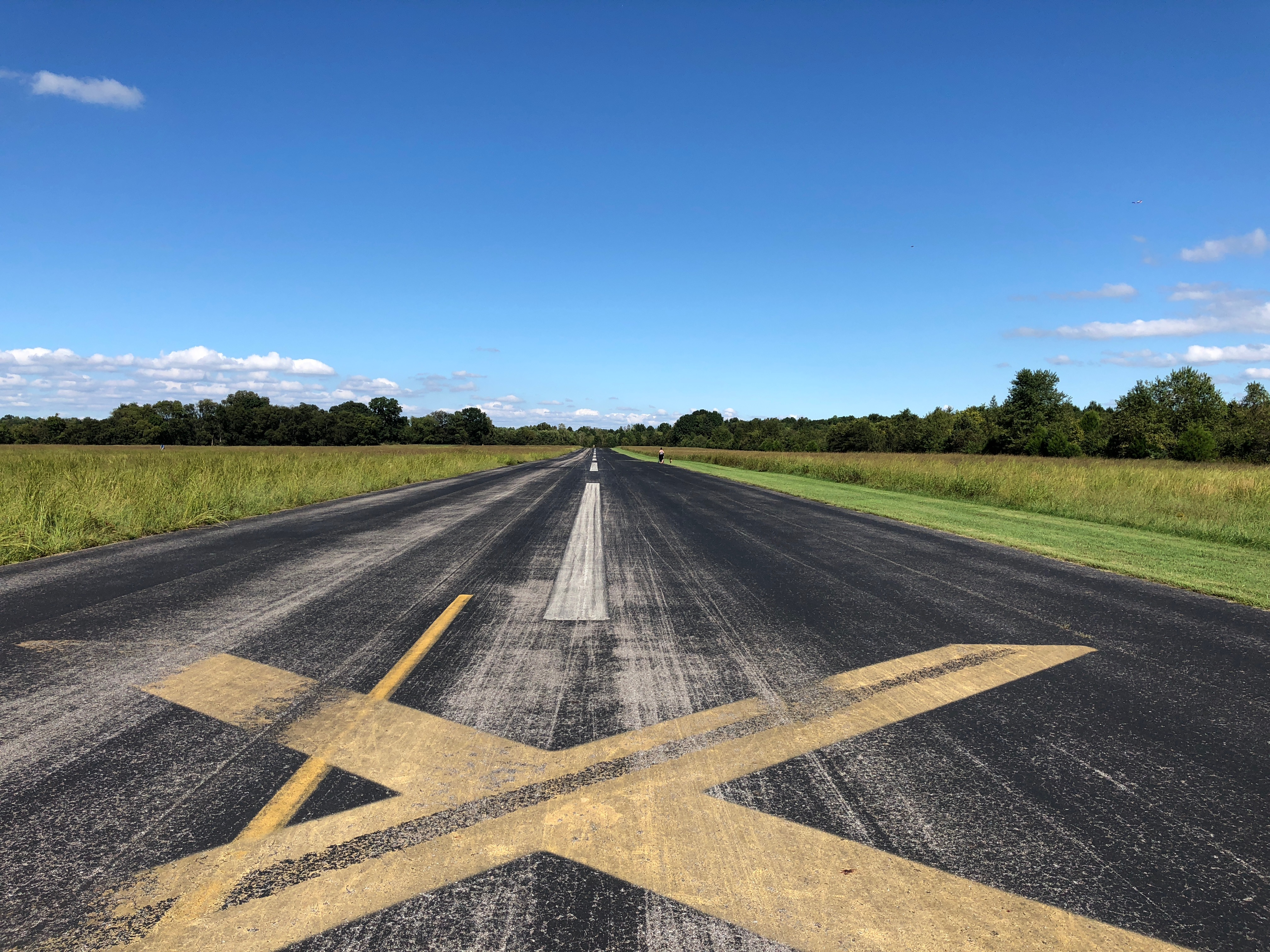
Runway at Cornelia Fort Airpark as seen in 2018. The facility was closed in 2011.

Musician Earl Scruggs was injured in a night landing of his single-engine plane at the airpark. He was flying solo in his 1974 Cessna Skyhawk II returning from a musical performance in Murray, Kentucky around midnight on September 29, 1975. On his approach descent he encountered fog and overshot the runway. The plane flipped over, but the ELT (Emergency Locator Transmitter) device in the airplane did not trigger. Scruggs remained unattended with a broken ankle, nose, and other injuries for about five hours. Fearing a possible fire, Scruggs was able to crawl about 150 feet from the plane despite his injuries. His family was driving back from the concert in Kentucky and was unaware of the accident, but a niece became worried, called police about 4 AM and went to the airpark where they heard his cry for help near the wreckage. Scruggs recovered from his injuries.

Thirty small planes were damaged at Cornelia Fort Airport during the 1998 tornado outbreak.

Russell W. Brothers Jr., a Nashville businessman, was familiar with Cornelia Fort Airpark and at one time lived there. At age 75, Brothers was flying a private plane solo at night from Miami, Florida to Dickson, Tennessee on April 20, 2012. After trouble with the landing gear, he made a crash-landing in his 1961 vintage twin-engine Beechcraft airplane at the Cornelia Fort Airpark which was closed at the time. Without functioning landing gear, he made a belly landing on a grassy area. The landing was not violent enough to trigger an alert signal by the airplane's emergency locator transmitter which would have notified authorities. Brothers was not injured and left the scene without notifying authorities. His wife picked him up, and he left the plane there as a mystery. A maintenance worker later saw it, but did not alert authorities until the following morning. The police traced the plane to Brothers and searched his home, where they found 16 firearms. Since he had a prior conviction as a felon 24 years previously, it was unlawful for Brothers to possess firearms. Subsequently, he was convicted of unlawful possession of firearms and obstruction of justice. Brothers pleaded guilty in U.S. District Court to the weapons charge and also to obstruction of a federal investigation, receiving a 15-month jail sentence.

== Facilities and aircraft ==
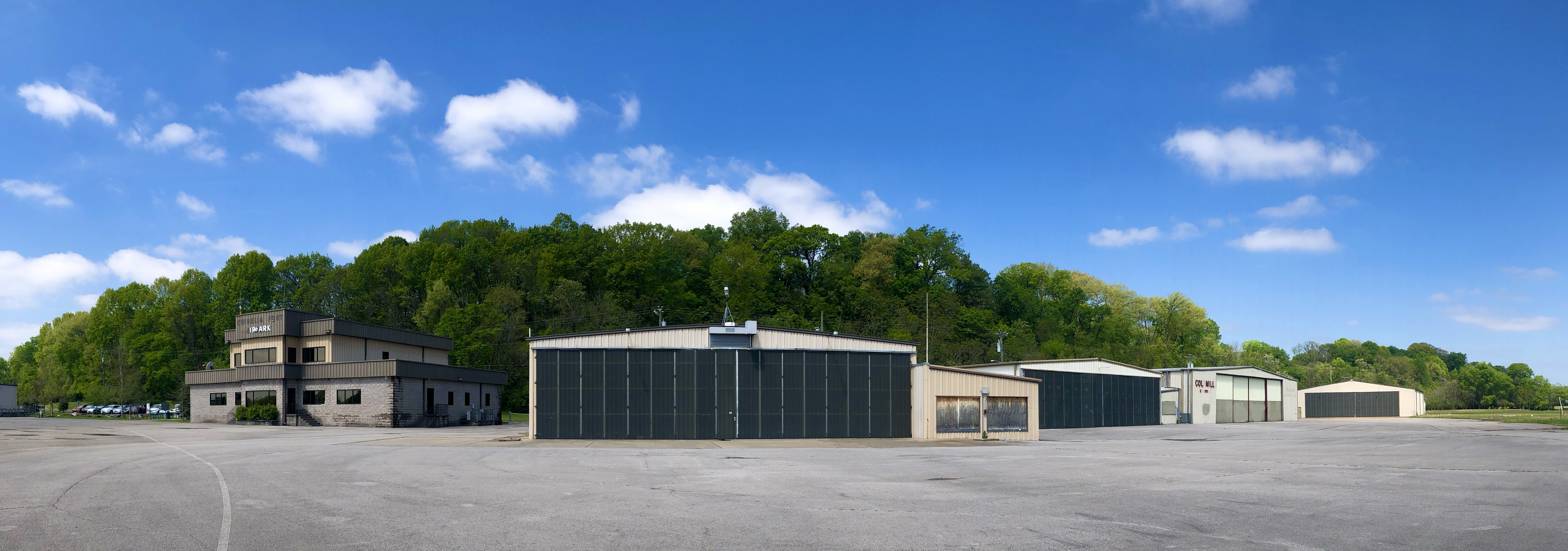
The airport's former facilities

Cornelia Fort Airpark covered an area of 300 acres (121 ha) at an elevation of 418 feet (127 m) above mean sea level. It had one runway designated 4/22 with an asphalt surface measuring 3,500 by 50 feet (1,067 x 15 m).

For the 12-month period ending March 6, 2009, the airport had 30,110 aircraft operations, an average of 82 per day: 95% general aviation and 5% air taxi. At that time there were 27 aircraft based at this airport: 74% single-engine and 26% multi-engine.
