= Sam Davis Statue =

Statue of Confederate soldier Sam Davis in Nashville, Tennessee

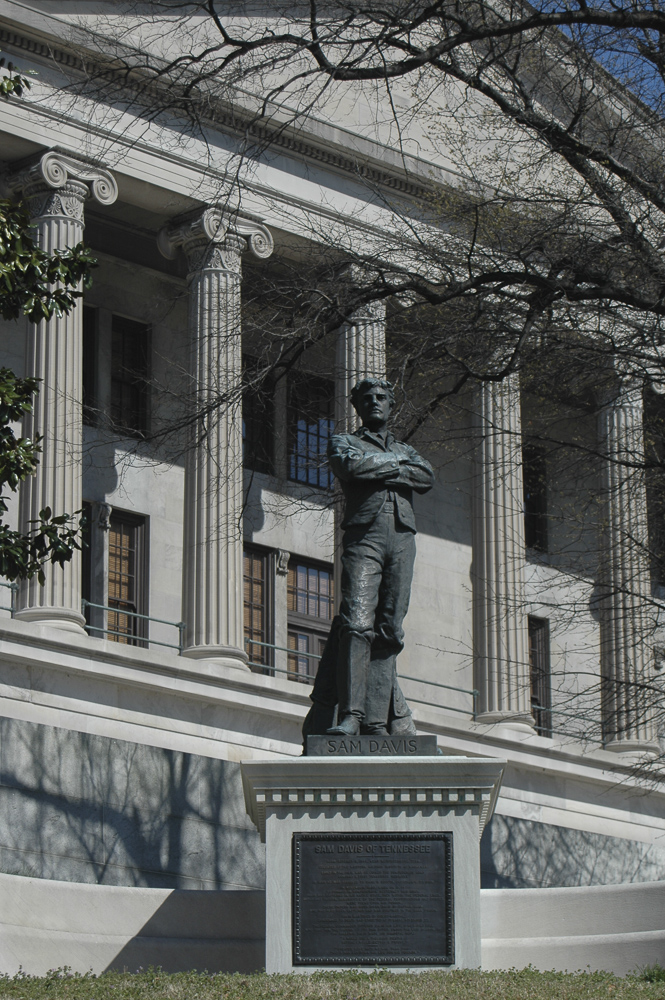
- The Sam Davis Statue in 2006

- Location within Tennessee Location within the United States
- Artist: George Julian Zolnay
- Year: 1909
- Location: Nashville, Tennessee, United States; 36°9′54.35″N 86°47′3.25″W

The Sam Davis Statue is a historic bronze statue of Sam Davis, the "Boy Hero of the Confederacy," outside the Tennessee State Capitol in Nashville, Tennessee.

== History ==
Its commission was first suggested by Sumner Archibald Cunningham, the founding editor of Confederate Veteran. It was designed by sculptor George Julian Zolnay. Built with bronze, it is nine feet tall on top of a marble pedestal. The western plaque includes lines from a poem by Ella Wheeler Wilcox. The monument cost almost $8,000 (equivalent to $286,667 in 2025) to build. The bronze sculpture cost $4,000 (equivalent to $143,333 in 2025) and the marble pedestal $3,000 (equivalent to $107,500 in 2025).

The dedication was held on April 29, 1909. It was attended by thousands (between 3,000 and 5,000), including members of the Davis family, Confederate veterans in uniform, and members of the United Daughters of the Confederacy. Major Eugene C. Lewis introduced Governor Malcolm R. Patterson, who gave a speech praising Davis. Lewis then read a letter by Colonel Hume R. Field. It was followed by a prayer by Reverend James Hugh McNeilly of Glen Leven Presbyterian Church. Finally, Davis's grandniece, Elizabeth Ewing Davis, unveiled the statue by taking off the Confederate flags covering it.

=== 2017 protest ===
On August 28, 2017, in the wake of the Unite the Right rally in Charlottesville, Virginia, protesters covered the statue, but the Tennessee Highway Patrol and the Nashville Fire Department uncovered it half an hour later.

== See also ==
- Nathan Bedford Forrest Bust formerly inside the Tennessee State Capitol
- Statue of Sam Davis at Montgomery Bell Academy, Nashville
