= Cornelia Fort =

American aviator (1919–1943)

Cornelia Clark Fort
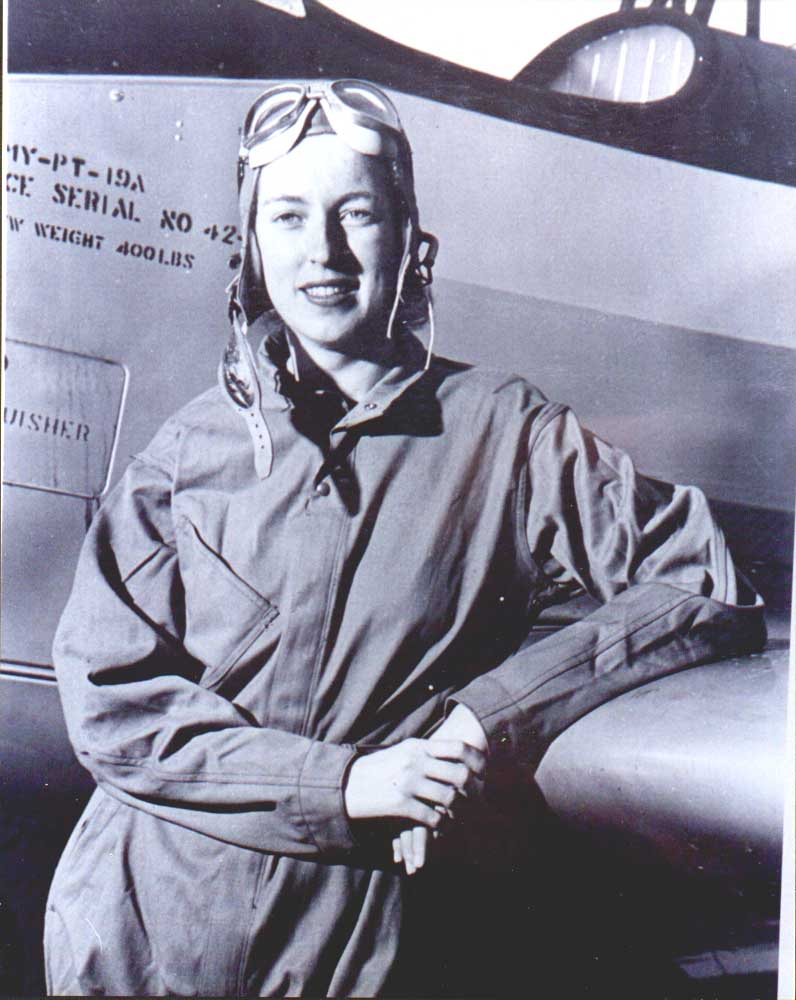
- Cornelia Clark Fort, resting on her plane
- Born: February 5, 1919; Nashville, Tennessee, U.S.
- Died: March 21, 1943 (aged 24) near Merkel, Texas, U.S.
- Education: Sarah Lawrence College
- Occupation: Aviator
- Years active: 1940–1943

Cornelia Clark Fort (February 5, 1919 – March 21, 1943) was an American aviator who became famous for being part of two aviation-related events. The first occurred while conducting a civilian training flight at Pearl Harbor on December 7, 1941, when she was the first United States pilot to encounter the Japanese air fleet during the Attack on Pearl Harbor. She and her student narrowly escaped a mid-air collision with the Japanese aircraft and a strafing attack after making an emergency landing.

The following year, Fort became the second member of what was to become the Women Airforce Service Pilots or WASP. Fort was working as a WASP ferry pilot on 21 March 1943 when she became the first female pilot in American history to die while on active duty. She was involved in a mid-air collision and crashed ten miles south of Merkel, Texas, in Mulberry Canyon.

== Early life ==
Fort was born on February 5, 1919, as the fourth child to a wealthy and prominent family in Nashville, Tennessee; her father, Rufus Elijah Fort, was a founder of National Life and Accident Insurance Company. She received a high school certificate from the Ward-Belmont School in 1936. She graduated from Sarah Lawrence College in 1939. After college, Fort joined the Junior League of Nashville.

She showed an early interest in flying, especially after her father made her three older brothers promise to never fly an airplane. Having not thought to make Cornelia swear a similar oath, she ultimately trained to earn her pilot's license in Nashville. She was the second woman in Tennessee to get her commercial license and the first woman in Tennessee to get her instructors' license and in celebration flew 2,000 miles in a single day looping from home to St.Louis and as far south as the Mississippi Delta. She applied to many flying schools and was accepted as an instructor at a Colorado flight training school. While in Colorado, she was offered a position in Hawaii from the John Rodgers Field based Andrew Flying Service, which she accepted.

== Flying career ==
=== Pearl Harbor attack ===
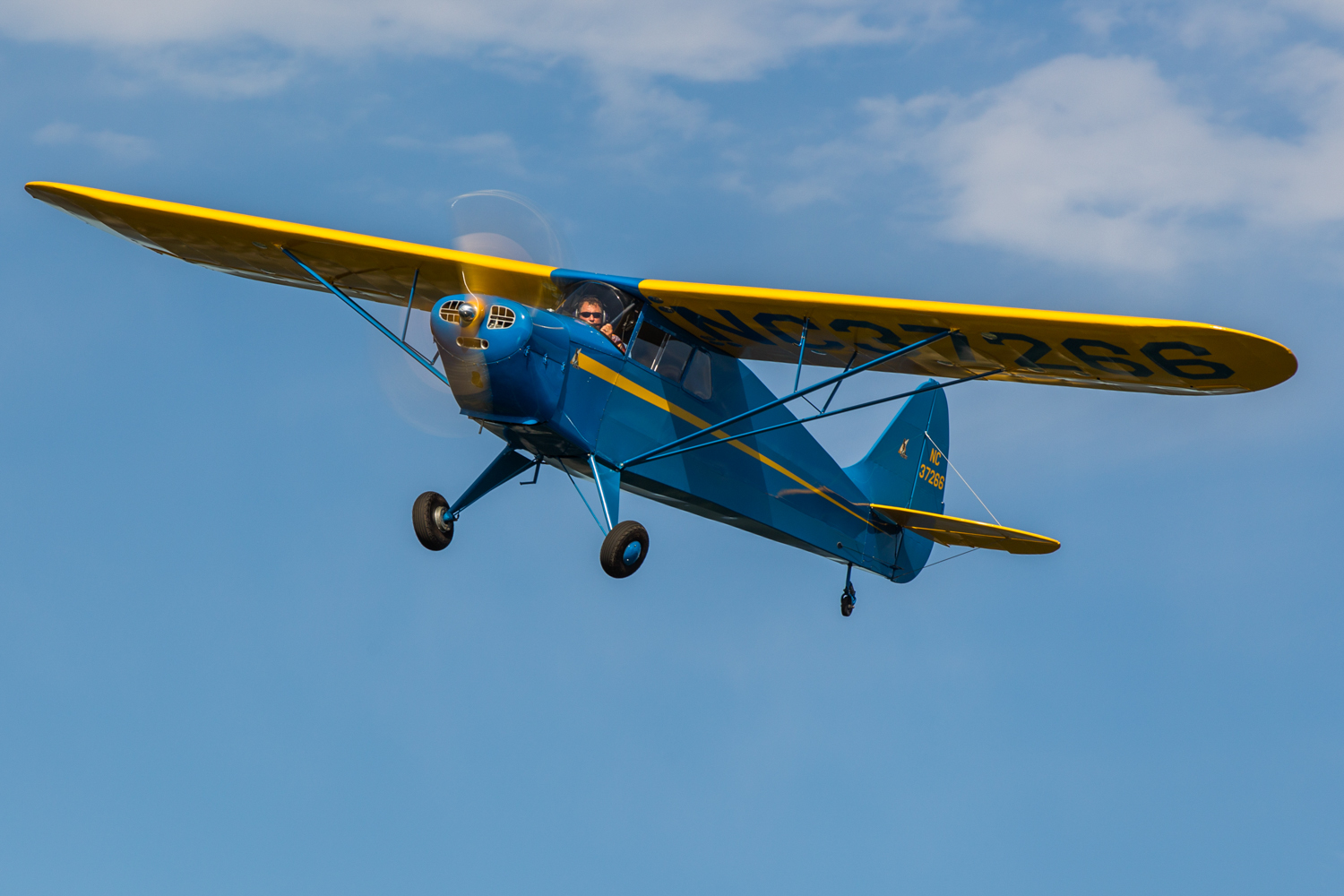
An Interstate Cadet airplane.

While working as a civilian pilot instructor at Pearl Harbor, Cornelia Fort inadvertently became one of the first witnesses to the Japanese Attack on Pearl Harbor that brought the United States into World War II. On December 7, 1941, Fort took off in the early morning from John Rodgers Field teaching takeoffs and landings to a student pilot in an Interstate Cadet monoplane. Her airplane and a few other civilian aircraft were the only U.S. planes in the air near the harbor at that time. Fort saw a military airplane flying directly toward her and swiftly grabbed the controls from her student to pull up over the oncoming craft. The aircraft passed so close that it rattled the windows of her trainer aircraft. It was then when she saw the rising sun insignia on the wings. Within moments, she saw billows of black smoke coming from Pearl Harbor and bombers flying in. She tried to convince herself that it was some sort of military drill, but in her own words, "Something detached itself from an airplane and came glistening down. My eyes followed it down, down, and even with knowledge pounding in my mind, my heart turned convulsively when the bomb exploded in the middle of the harbor." She quickly landed the plane at John Rodgers civilian airport near the mouth of Pearl Harbor. The pursuing Zero strafed her plane and the runway as she and her student ran for cover. No one on the ground believed her frantic story until a mechanic came up to say that Robert Tyce, manager of the K-T Flying Service at the airport, had been shot in the head and was killed. Two other civilian planes did not return that morning. "He never did pay me for that half hour instruction", Cornelia recalled.

=== Women's Auxiliary Ferrying Squadron ===
With all civilian flights grounded in Hawaii, Fort returned to the mainland in early 1942. She made a short movie promoting war bonds that was successful and led to speaking engagements. Later that year, Nancy Love recruited her to serve in the newly established Women's Auxiliary Ferrying Squadron (WAFS), precursor to the Women Airforce Service Pilots. She was the second woman accepted into the service. The WAFS ferried military planes to bases within the United States.

==== Death ====
Stationed at the 6th Ferrying Group base at Long Beach, California, Cornelia Fort became the first WAFS fatality. On March 21, 1943, while flying in close formation - a maneuver forbidden to ferry pilots and one which Cornelia had never before attempted - en route from Long Beach to Love Field in Dallas, the left wing of her BT-13 was struck by the landing gear of flight officer Frank Stamme Jr.'s plane. The pair had been flying too close together, with Stamme approaching her and then pulling back multiple times. On one of the close passes, the collision took place, breaking off the tip of her wing and six feet of leading edge. Stamme was able to control his aircraft, but Fort went into an irreversible dive and crashed. Investigations found the engine buried multiple feet into the ground with the canopy's emergency hatch release having never been engaged, and after the crash it remained locked shut. The accident occurred ten miles south of Merkel, Texas in Mulberry Canyon, Texas. At the time of the accident, Cornelia Fort was one of the most accomplished pilots of the WASPs. The footstone of her grave is inscribed, "Killed in the Service of Her Country." She was the first female pilot in American history to die while on active duty flying for her country.

== Legacy ==
Cornelia Fort was portrayed in the film Tora! Tora! Tora! by actress Jeff Donnell. The Cornelia Fort Airpark in East Nashville is named after her.

== See also ==
- Women Airforce Service Pilots (WASP)
- Women Airforce Service Pilots Badge
- United States Army Air Forces
- Women's Army Corps (WAC)
- United States Army Air Forces
- United States Air Force
