= Russell Brothers =

American businessman (born 1937)

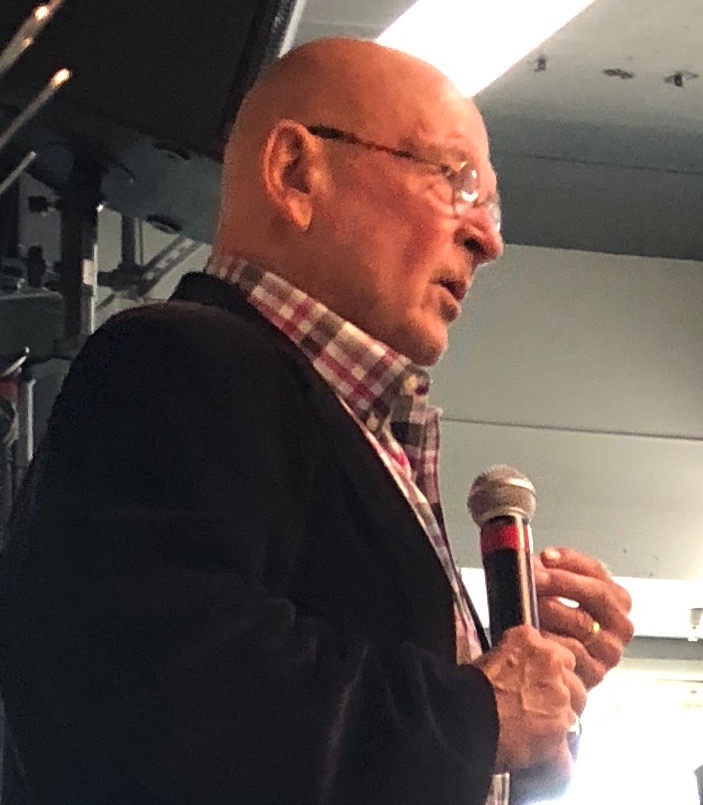
- Date: May, 2018
- Born: Russell White Brothers, Jr. June 1937 (age 88); Nashville, Tennessee
- Education: Montgomery Bell Academy
- Alma mater: Vanderbilt University
- Occupations: Coal company executive; insurance executive; airplane broker; pilot

Russell White Brothers, Jr. (born June 1937), is an American businessman in Nashville, Tennessee.

He was born into a prosperous and socially prominent family in Nashville, and had considerable advantages as far as education and upbringing. Despite this, his avocation as an airplane pilot turned to cocaine trafficking on a large scale. According to one judge, Brothers became "the giant among giants" in international smuggling. Brothers made his money by flying planes loaded with large amounts of cocaine from Colombia to the Bahamas, then transporting the cocaine by high-speed boats to south Florida and from there to Tennessee, and eventually to Canada. The millions of dollars in profits were directed to banks in Belgium, Gibraltar, Montreal, Panama, and Costa Rica. These funds were then reinvested locally in order to launder the money. Brothers testified that he would fly as much as 600 kilograms of cocaine from Colombia to the Bahamas, then to Nashville, unload the bags into a van, then take them to his Belle Meade home. From there he would take the cocaine to his family's Williamson County farm, where Canadian purchasers would pick it up.

== Early life ==
Brothers grew up in Belle Meade, a well-to-do suburb of Nashville. His grandfather and father jointly ran a wholesale grocery business, the M.P. Brothers Company. His father, Russell W. Brothers Sr., was one of the founders of Nashville's Baptist Hospital and owned three businesses: the Velvet Ice Cream Company (1949–1970), the Anthony Pure Milk Company, and the Russell W. Brothers Insurance Company. The junior Brothers attended Montgomery Bell Academy (MBA), a private Nashville prep school for boys. In 1956, his senior year, he played fullback for MBA's state championship football team. The quarterback was Thomas F. Frist, Jr. who later co-founded Hospital Corporation of America and became one of the Forbes 400 wealthiest Americans. The halfback was Frank Drowota, who later became the Chief Justice of the Tennessee Supreme Court. Brothers was awarded a football scholarship to Vanderbilt University. He is the father of four children. His businesses included a coal company, an insurance agency, and a brokerage company for airplanes. In his airplane brokerage business during the 1980s, he began selling planes for cash to clients who were cocaine smugglers. When his coal business developed financial problems he turned to criminal activity. Testifying in federal court, Brothers stated, "Through my connection of knowing these people, I asked them if I could become involved in their business.. . . I did, and I was successful".

== First conviction ==
He was convicted in Florida's Broward County Circuit Court on October 24, 1988, on charges of racketeering, trafficking, and conspiracy to traffic in cocaine. According to Broward Circuit Judge Patti Englander Henning, Brothers' operation included bribing U.S. Customs officials. The conviction allowed the state to confiscate Brothers' property because it was deemed obtained by illegal means. Approximately $6 million in real estate and other assets was confiscated in what authorities called the largest seizure of property in Florida's history at that time. It included a 248-acre farm near Nashville, a restaurant, two airplanes, two boats, a $600,000 loan to a ranch in Limestone County, Texas, and an aircraft-chartering firm. He was fined $1 million and sentenced to 60 years in prison, of which he served 11 years.

== Second conviction ==
In 1992, while incarcerated, Brothers was served with a federal criminal complaint charging him with money-laundering and additional drug trafficking. Brothers' attorney, G. Thomas Nebel, was suspected as having a role on the laundering of the money and was charged, as well as Brothers' cousin, Thomas Brothers, a Davidson County (Nashville) Circuit Court Judge.

As a private attorney before being appointed judge, Judge Thomas Brothers did some work for his cousin, Russell Brothers, in 1986. Federal prosecutors tried to prove that Thomas Brothers knowingly helped Russell Brothers conceal a source of his income and channel almost $1 million into a farm on West Harpeth Road, near Franklin, Tennessee. At his own trial, Thomas Brothers was acquitted on the charges, as well as two money-laundering charges.

Nebel was an attorney who had previously represented Russell Brothers, his former golf partner. Federal prosecutors contended that Nebel invested more than $5 million of Brothers' drug-smuggling profits and then lied to investigators when asked about his role in the case. The U.S. Attorney, Janice Bossing, was accused of legal misconduct in obtaining this information. Nebel was offered immunity from prosecution if he would testify as to Brothers' criminal activities, including setting up companies that received drug money. The testimony resulted in Brothers being convicted in 1993 on charges of money-laundering and additional counts of cocaine trafficking . Also in 1992, Russell Brothers offered substantial assistance to prosecutors, including testifying and giving information in the federal prosecution of another accused drug trafficker, Allan Ross. For this testimony, Brothers' sentence was subsequently reduced making him eligible for immediate release on parole.

== Airplane ransom incident ==
In 2010, Brothers allegedly loaned a business partner $12,000 to close on a real estate transaction. After a dispute occurred when payment was delayed, Brothers was seen on surveillance cameras absconding with the partner's $300,000 airplane from Nashville's John C. Tune Airport. The plane was flown to nearby Dickson, Tennessee, and sequestered pending repayment. Brothers is alleged to have set up a meeting at a west Nashville restaurant with the partner and settle the debt. The partner arrived at the meeting with police, and Brothers was charged with felony theft.

== Third conviction ==
On the night of April 20, 2012, Brothers, age 75, was piloting a private plane solo from Miami, Florida, to Dickson, Tennessee. After mechanical trouble, he crash-landed his 1961 vintage twin-engine Beechcraft airplane without landing gear on a grassy area at the closed and decommissioned Cornelia Fort Airpark, now a city park in Nashville. The belly-landing was soft enough that the plane's automatic crash locator which would have alerted authorities was not triggered. Uninjured, Brothers left the scene and did not notify any authorities. His wife picked him up, and the plane was left as a mystery for the police to solve. A maintenance worker saw the plane, but did not alert authorities until it was still there the following morning. The police traced the plane to Brothers and six days later searched his home. They found 16 firearms, including handguns, rifles, and shotguns. Due to his conviction as a felon 24 years prior, it was unlawful for him to possess firearms. A federal grand jury issued a five-count indictment which, in addition to the weapons possession, included obstruction of justice. Brothers pleaded guilty in U.S. District Court to the weapons charge and also to obstruction of a federal investigation, receiving a 15-month jail sentence.
