= Shelby Park (Nashville) =

Public park in Nashville, Tennessee

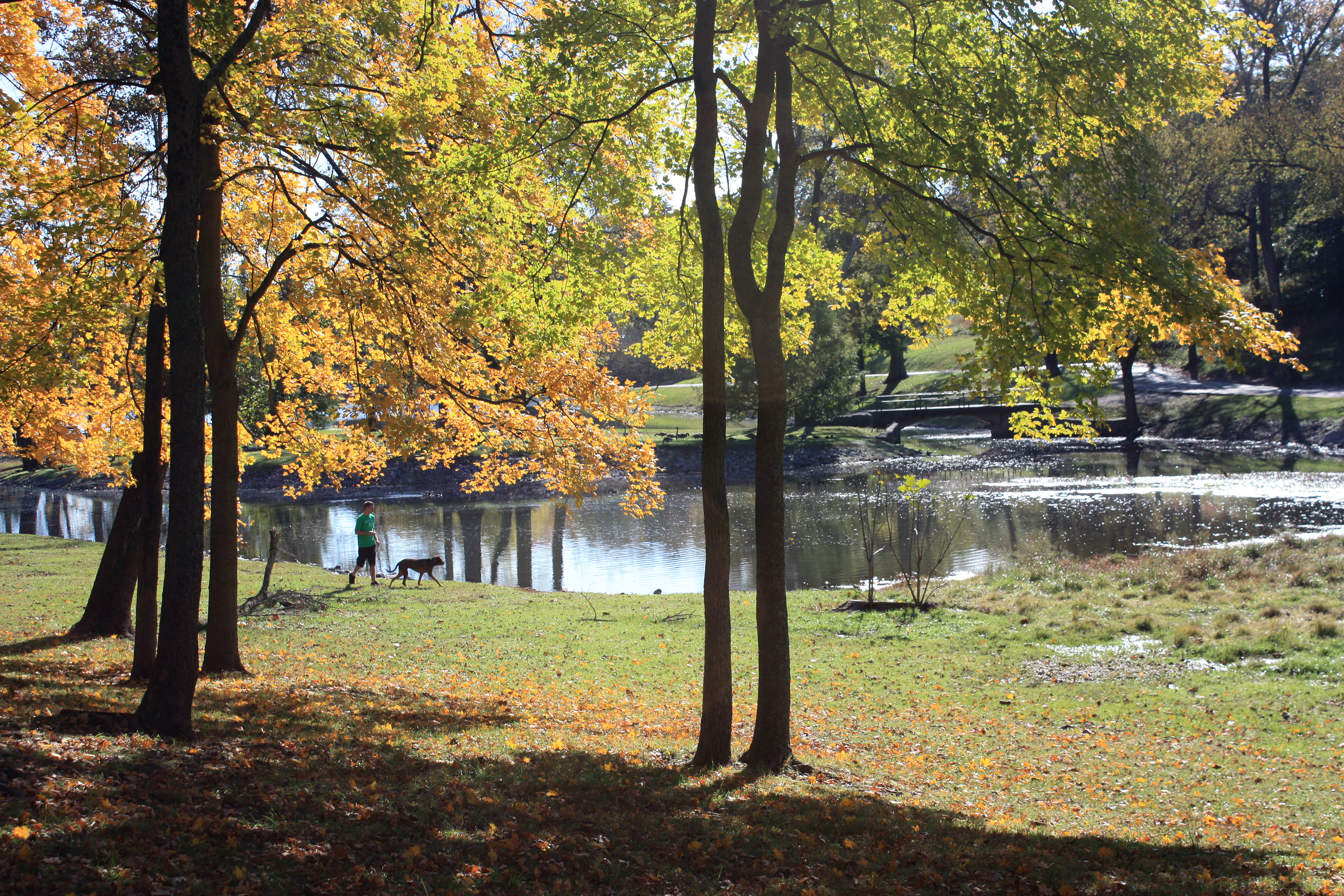
- Interactive map of Shelby Park
- Type: Public park
- Location: East Nashville, Tennessee
- Coordinates: 36.170°N 86.730°W
- Area: 361-acre (1.46 km^{2})
- Operator: Metropolitan Nashville Department of Parks and Recreation

Shelby Park is a large urban park located approximately three miles (five km) east of downtown Nashville along the Cumberland River. The park includes playgrounds, a dog park, baseball fields, two golf courses, and a community center. The park is located between the Lockeland Springs, Shelby Hills, and Rolling Acres neighborhoods. Until the 2011 opening of E. S. Rose Park, the Belmont Bruins baseball team played a portion of its home games at the park. The park includes over 361 acres (1.46 km^{2}) of land.

== History ==
The Nashville Park Commission acquired the initial land for the park in 1909, purchasing 151 acres (0.61 km^{2}) that had been previously used for an amusement park. Shelby Park officially opened on July 4, 1912.

A few scenes in Touchstone's 1991 film Ernest Scared Stupid were filmed here.

In 2011 Nashville purchased the adjoining historic Cornelia Fort Airpark (named for Cornelia Fort) which had been the destination for singer Patsy Cline when she was killed in a plane crash on March 5, 1963. The combined Shelby Park/Shelby Bottoms/Cornelia Fort Airpark has more than 1,000 acres of greenspace.

On Saturday, Oct. 13, 2012, Shelby Park's 100th Birthday was celebrated with a Birthday Bash hosted by the Friends of Shelby Park & Bottoms.

== Master plan and renovations ==
In 2009, Metro Parks, in consultation with EOA Architects and Hawkins Partners Landscape Architects, developed a master plan for Shelby Park. Projects completed through summer 2015 added a special events field, new parking with pervious paving, improvements to a stream, and off street trails for bikers, runners and walkers linked to the adjacent neighborhoods. Metro Arts installed Reflection, a 12-foot-tall mockingbird of stainless steel atop a granite plinth by artist Lawrence Argent, in a new plaza near the event field.
