= Tennessee Centennial and International Exposition =

Exposition held in Nashville, Tennessee in 1897

1897 Nashville
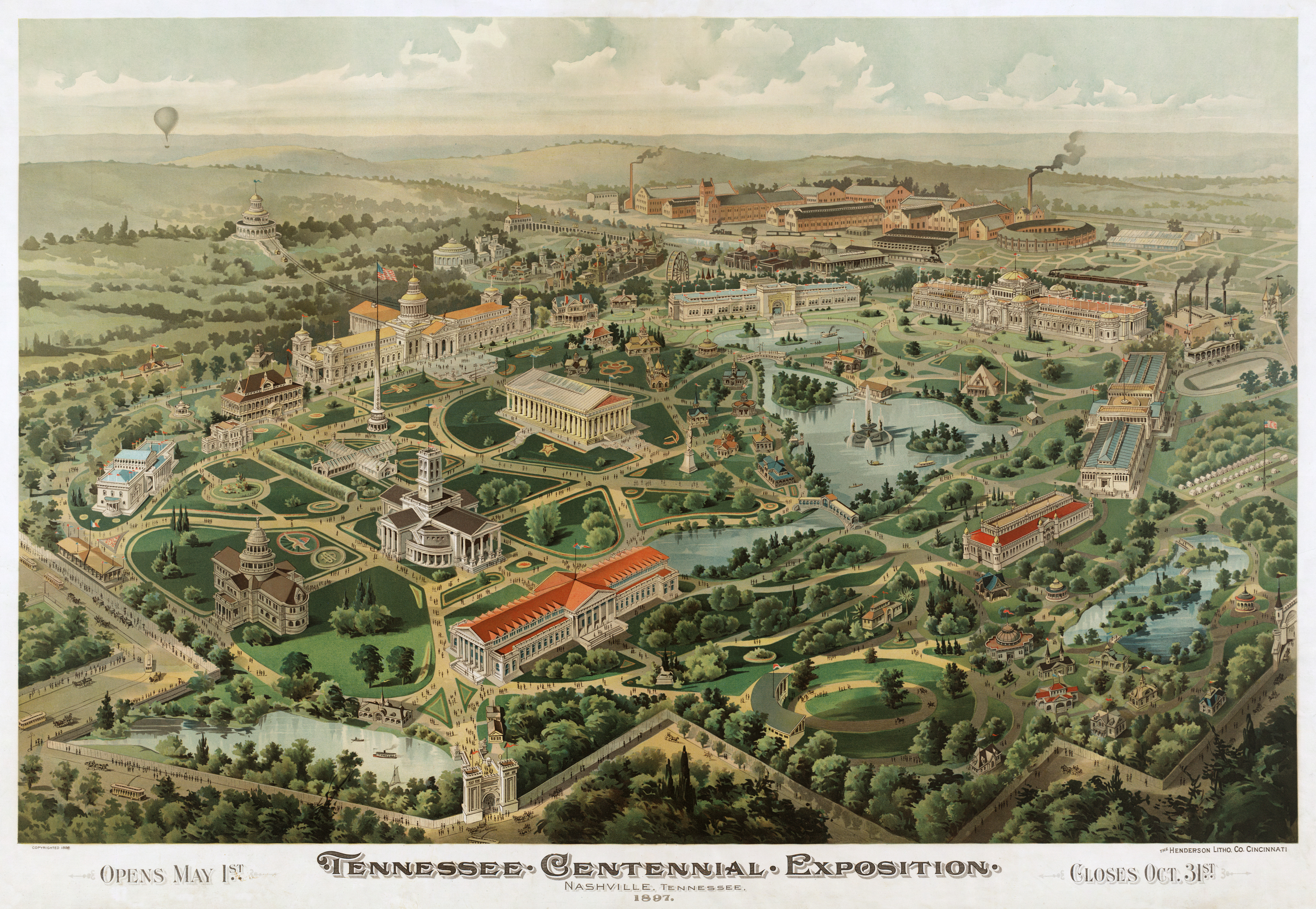
- Chromolithograph of bird's-eye view of the expo grounds

Overview
- BIE-class: Unrecognized exposition
- Name: Tennessee Centennial and International Exposition
- Building(s): More than 100 buildings
- Area: 200 acres
- Visitors: 1,786,714

Location
- Country: United States
- City: Nashville
- Venue: now Centennial Park

Timeline
- Opening: May 1, 1897
- Closure: October 31, 1897

The Tennessee Centennial and International Exposition was an exposition held in Nashville from May 1 – October 31, 1897 in what is now Centennial Park. A year late, it celebrated the 100th anniversary of Tennessee's entry into the union in 1796. President William McKinley officially opened the event from the White House, where he pressed a button that started the machinery building at the fair; he would visit in person a month later.

== Description ==
The Exposition grounds covered about 200 acres and was located on the western fringe of the city, with access to the streetcar line. The landscape plan featured the notable blue grass of the region planted in lawn areas. The more than 100 buildings included those devoted to agriculture, commerce, education, fine arts, history, machinery, minerals and forestry, and transportation. Others had special exhibits related to children, women and the United States Government. Many cities and organizations built buildings and exhibit halls on the Exposition grounds. Foreign nations also were represented here.

The Nashville, Chattanooga and St. Louis Railroad played a central role in the promotion and success of the Tennessee Centennial Exposition, and carried tourists to the event. John W. Thomas, who was president of the Railroad at the time, served as president of the Tennessee Centennial Exposition. Major Eugene Castner Lewis, who was the chief civil engineer for the Nashville, Chattanooga and St. Louis Railroad, served as the director general of the Exposition. Lewis had suggested that a reproduction of the Parthenon be built in Nashville as the centerpiece of Tennessee’s Centennial Celebration to highlight the city as the "Athens of the South".

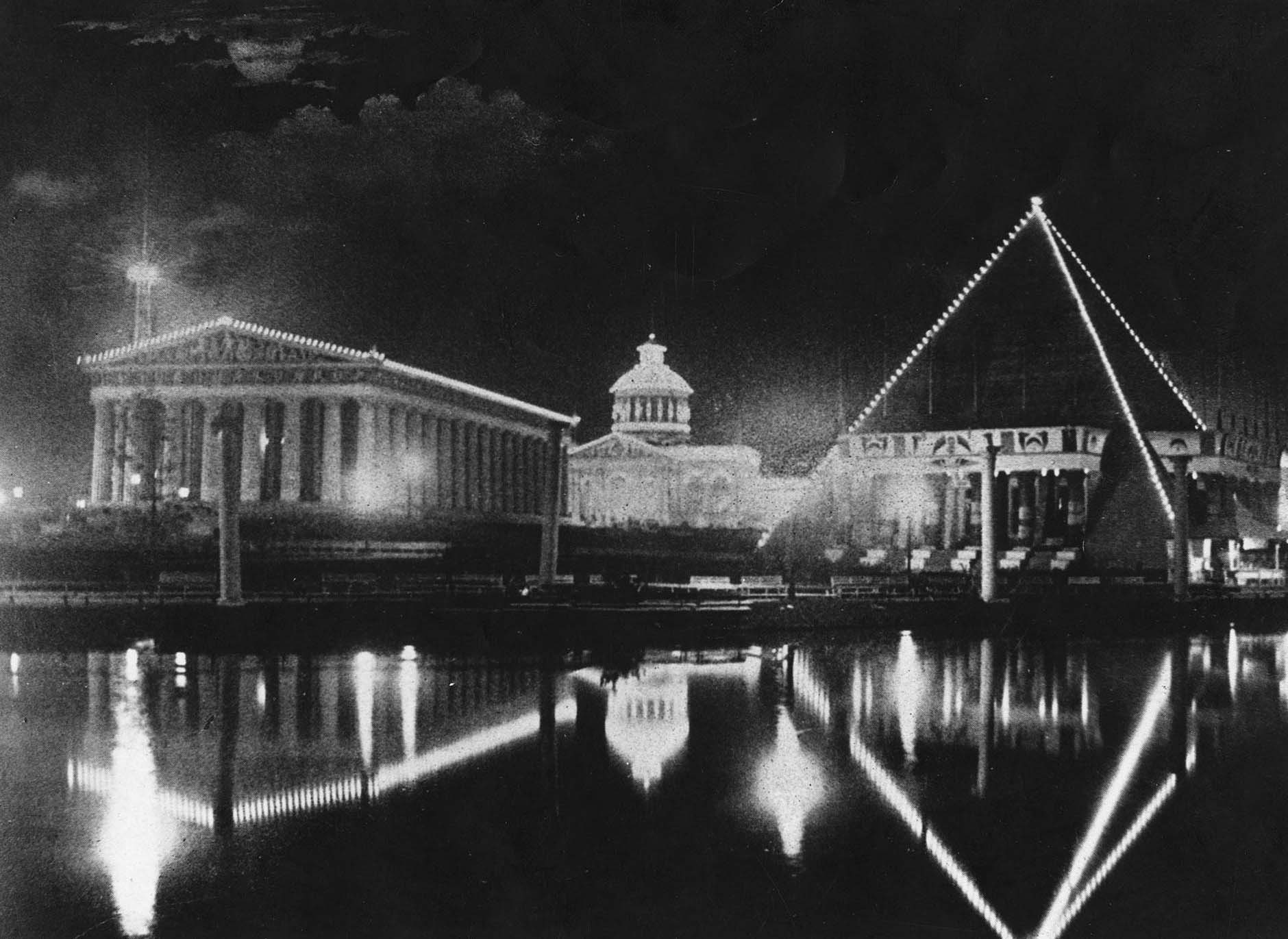
The Nashville and Memphis pavilions at night along Watauga Lake; the Commerce Building is at rear

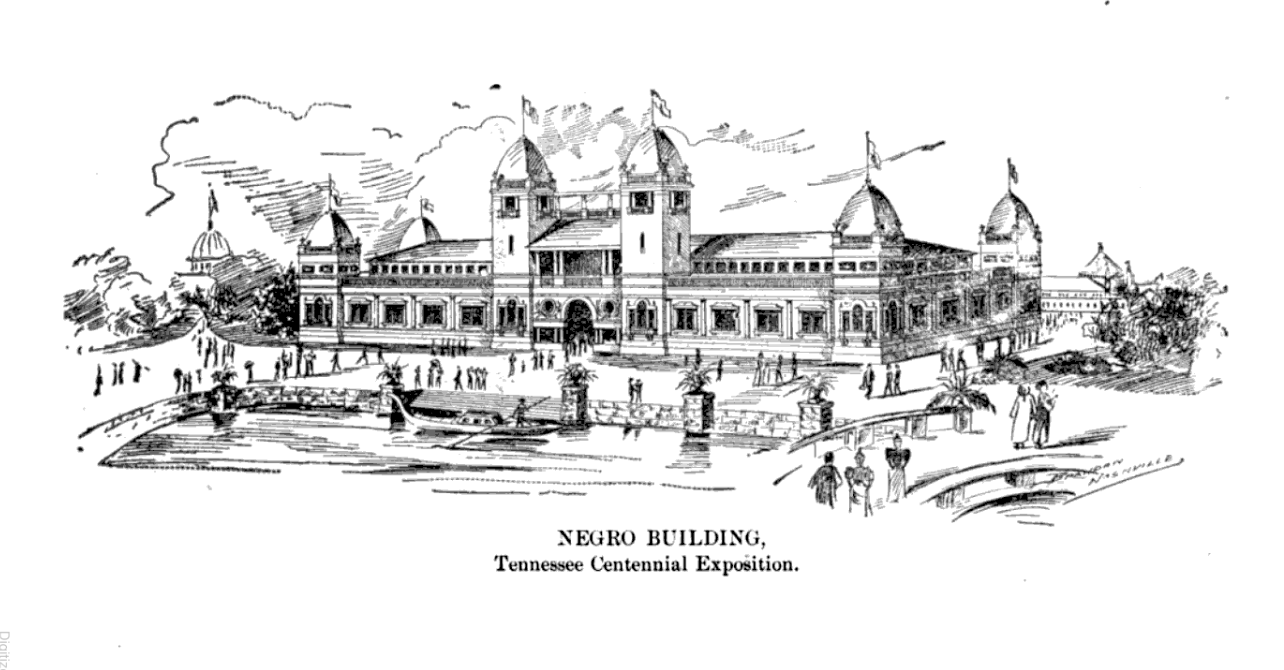
Tennessee Centennial Exposition's Negro Building

The City of Memphis featured a large pyramid in its exhibit, in honor of its Egyptian name. The Parthenon and the Pyramid were located next to each other on the shore of Lake Wautaga. Both the exhibits were lit at night. The separate Egyptian Pavilion featured popular belly dancers. During the exposition, Italian-style gondolas plied the lake, carrying tourists by water between exhibits.

Also located along Lake Watauga, the Negro Building was designed in a Spanish Renaissance style. Exhibits came from numerous cities, and Fisk University and Tuskegee Institute had their own exhibits. Booker T. Washington, president of the latter, was a featured speaker on Emancipation Day.

The total attendance was 1,786,714, of which the total paid attendance was 1,166,692. The total receipts were $1,101,285 (equivalent to $35.6 million in 2024), and the disbursements $1,101,246 (equivalent to $35.6 million in 2024).

The Parthenon was so popular that it was kept after most buildings and exhibits were dismantled. The original exposition grounds were adapted as Centennial Park for the city. Lake Watauga was also retained in the city park. The Centennial Exposition was a great success and is still considered one of the most notable events ever to be held in the state. Unlike most World's Fairs, it did not lose money, but the final accounting showed a direct profit of less than $50.

== Later developments ==
The fair remains a great source of civic pride for Nashvillians. Today the fairgrounds survive as Centennial Park, the flagship park managed by the Metropolitan Nashville Parks and Recreation Department.

The Parthenon replica built for the exhibition was made of temporary materials. Because of its popularity, it was reconstructed using permanent materials in a project lasting from 1920 to 1931. Today it is used as an art museum. Among its exhibits is Alan LeQuire's 1990 re-creation of the Athena Parthenos statue.

Nearly a century later, the United States held the 1982 World's Fair in Knoxville, Tennessee.
