= Concatenated Order of Hoo-Hoo =

International forestry fraternal order

- Founded: January 21, 1892; 134 years ago Gurdon, Arkansas, United States
- Type: Fraternal order
- Affiliation: Independent
- Status: Active
- Emphasis: Forestry
- Scope: International
- Motto: "Health, Happiness, and Long Life"
- Colors: White, Black, and Gold
- Mascot: Great Black Cat
- Publication: Log & Tally
- Chapters: 29 active
- Colonies: 13
- Nickname: Hoo-Hoos
- Headquarters: 207 East Main Street; Gurdon, Arkansas 71743-1237; United States
- Website: www.hoohoo.org

The International Concatenated Order of Hoo-Hoo, Incorporated, also known as the Fraternal Order of Lumbermen, is an international fraternal and service organization with members in the forest products industry. It was founded in Gurdon, Arkansas, in 1892. It is the oldest industrial fraternal organization in the United States. It has established 283 clubs in Australia, Canada, Malaysia, New Zealand, South Africa, and the United States. Its headquarters and museum are located in Gurdon.

== History ==
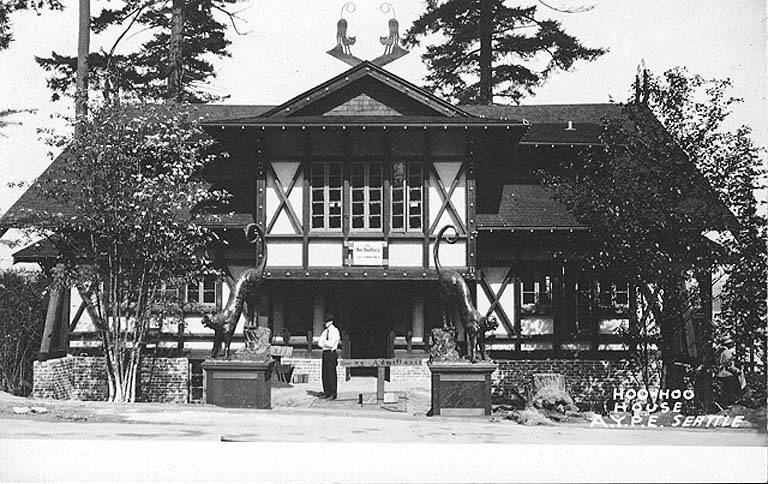
The Hoo-Hoo House at the Alaska–Yukon–Pacific Exposition of 1909 was designed for the Order by Ellsworth Storey. It later served almost half a century as the University of Washington faculty club.

The Concatenated order of Hoo-Hoo was founded on January 21, 1892, in Gurdon, Arkansas. On that day, Bolling Arthur Johnson, editor of the Timberman of Chicago, Illinois, attended a meeting of the Southern Lumber Manufacturers Association in Camden, Arkansas. Johnson and four other meeting attendees were detained in Gurdon for five hours due to a delayed train. While waiting in the parlor of the Hotel Hall, Johnson shared his idea for a national association for the lumber industry with his companions and a local lumberman.

These men, two of whom were members of the Freemasons and the Benevolent and Protective Order of Elks, created the guidelines for the first national organization for lumbermen. These six founders were:

- William Eddy Barns, editor of the St. Louis Lumberman of St. Louis, Missouri
- Bolling Arthur Johnson, editor of the Timberman of Chicago, Illinois
- William Starr Mitchell, business manager of the Arkansas Democrat of Little Rock, Arkansas
- George Washington Schwartz of the Vandalia Railroad of St. Louis, Missouri
- George Kimball Smith of the Southern Lumber Manufacturers Association
- Ludolph Adalbert Strauss of the Malvern Lumber Company of Malvern, Arkansas

Because most of the founders were only tangentially connected to the lumber industry, the name Independent Order of Camp Followers was first suggested. However, the group settled on the name Concatenated Order of Hoo-Hoo. It is also called the Fraternal Order of Lumbermen. Its purpose was to foster cooperation, promote communication, and establish a code of ethics for the lumber industry and its workers.

The founders wanted the organization to be unconventional and unregimented. Its aim was for its members to "live a hearty, healthy, and happy life". It was more informal than other secret societies of its day and did not have lodge rooms, enforce attendance at meetings, or anything else that other orders had that could be avoided.

The founders announced the Concatenated Order of Hoo-Hoo at the Northwestern Lumbermen’s Association in Duluth, Minnesoata. The order's first regular concatenation was held at the St. Charles Hotel in New Orleans, Louisiana, on February 18, 1892. At the meeting, 35 of the leading American lumbermen were initiated, bringing the membership to 167. Charles McCarer was elected as the group's first president or Snark of the Universe. Soon afterwards, similar installations were held in other states.

In 1899, the order had 5,000 members. By 1924, it had grown to 7,000 members. In 1923, the order's headquarters was at the Arcade Building in St. Louis. The group became international in May 1924 with the chartering of the Winnipeg Hoo-Hoo Club No. 24 in Winnipeg, Manitoba, Canada.

Membership was originally limited to lumbermen (and a few newspaper and railroad men) but was later expanded to include saw mill workers, woodworkers, and saw mill machinists. As a result of the Great Depression, membership declined significantly from 1929 to 1938, getting as low as 700. However, the Hoo-Hoos quickly recovered, growing to as many as 13,000 active members at its height in the 1950s. Elizabeth Taylor agreed to be Miss Hoo-Hoo in 1948. In 1962, Adelaide Hoo-Hoo Club No. 212 was established, becoming the first chapter installed in Australia. It then expanded to South Africa and the South Pacific.

In 1970, the order's international headquarters moved to Boston, Massachusetts. It moved to Gurdon in 1981, where it dedicated a museum in April 1981. In 2004, the order had more than 3,500 members; this had dropped to 2,500 in 2014.

The Concatenated Order of Hoo-Hoo's headquarters and its museum are at 207 East Main Street in Gurdon, Arkansas. It is the oldest industrial fraternal organization in the United States. The Hoo-Hoo Monument in Gurdon was designed by George Julian Zolnay in 1909, and is listed on the National Register of Historic Places.

== Rituals and symbols ==
The order's name was symbolic to its founders. Concatenated was selected for its meaning of "linked together as a chain". Hoo-Hoo originated a month prior at a meeting in Kansas City, where B. Arthur Johnson called Charles McCarer's unusual tuft of hair a "hoo-hoo" during a speech. Throughout the meeting, the men had use the phrase 'hoo-hoo" to describe a good card hand, strange clothing, and drinks. Johson later said that it was "a made word coined by me in a whimsical phase at a luncheon in Kansas City when I called attention to the fact that Charles McCaren was not bald-headed, for he had a little wisp of tawny hair curled up in the center of his poll like an Indian top-knot, and I called this startling appendage a 'hoo-hoo'". McCaren was honored with membership number one of the Concatenated Order of Hoo-Hoo and was elected its first president or Snark of the Universe.

The names for some of the order's officers were inspired by Lewis Carroll's The Hunting of the Snark, which had recently been read by Barnes. Others came from historical Egyptian lore, which was also used for the group's symbols. The executive committee of the order is the Supreme Nine. It consisted of the Snark of the Universe (president), the Senior Hoo-Hoo, the Junior Hoo-Hoo, Scrivenoter (secretary), Bojum (chaplain), Jabberwock, Custocatian, Arcanoper, and Gurdon (sergeant-of-arms). Past presidents were called Rameses. Each state or foreign country was ruled by a Viceregent Snark. Local groups were called Concatenations.

The Concatenated Order of the Hoo-Hoo's motto is "Health, Happiness, and Long Life". The order's colors are white, black, and gold. Its symbols were of Egyptian origin, including the mascot, which is the Great Black Cat, and its emblem is of a black cat with its tail curled into the shape of a figure nine. New members are called "kittens".

The number nine figures prominently in the order's policies, originating with the "nine lives" of a cat. The group has nine officers and was originally limited to 9,999 members; this was changed to 99,999 when the order became international. Annual business meetings are held on the ninth day of the ninth month at nine minutes after the ninth hour. Originally, the order's initiation fee was 99 cents and the annual dues were $9.99. Later, it was organized into nine jurisdictions. Theodore Roosevelt was given membership number 999 in appreciation of his efforts to preserve forests.

Its publication is the Log & Tally. The order's nickname is Hoo-Hoos.

== Membership ==
Membership was originally restricted to white males over 21 who were engaged in the lumber industry, with an exception for a few newspapermen and railroad men. Later, it was opened to include saw mill workers, woodworkers, and saw mill machinists. Mrs. Mary Anne Smith of Searcy, Arkansas, was initiated before the gender requirement was passed in 1893, so she was the order's first and only female member until the organization went coed in 1993.

Membership is now open to people of all genders age eighteen and up who are of good moral character and are engaged in the forestry industry or "genuinely interested in supporting the purpose and aims of our order". The order is limited to a total of 99,999 members.

The order's membership includes several degrees of mystic rites. The initiatory degree is the Osirion Cloister, which replaced the original Chamber of Horrors in 1897. The House of Ancients was created by Johnson in 1894; it was revised in 1902. It includes past presidents who enter the house through "the embalming of the Snark".

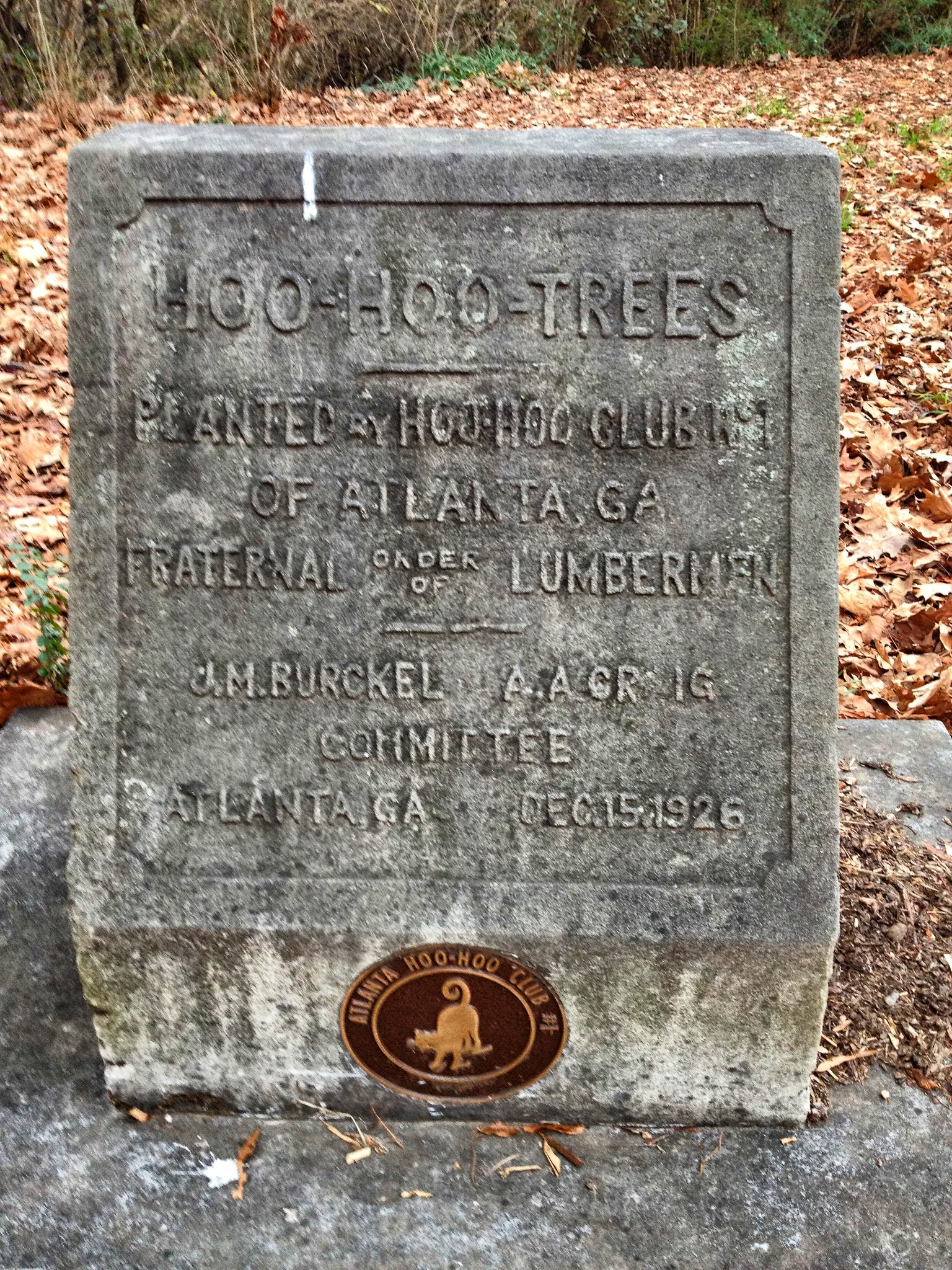
A monument was erected commemorating the 1926 planting of trees by the Atlanta Hoo Hoo Club in Piedmont Park, Atlanta, Georgia.

== Activities ==
The order does not have any sick, disability, or death benefits, but it does quietly perform some charitable work among its members and assist them in finding employment.

The Atlanta chapter of the Hoo Hoos worked and socialized with the Southern Forestry Congress. A monument commemorating the planting of trees by the Atlanta chapter of the Hoo Hoo Club in 1926 stands just inside the Park Avenue entrance to Piedmont Park.

On September 13, 1969, the order dedicated the Hoo-Hoo Redwood Memorial Grove in Prairie Creek Redwoods State Park in Humboldt County, California. The Hoo-Hoo International and Forestry Museum was established in Gurdon, Arkansas, in 1981 and is housed in a Works Project Administration log cabin.

== Chapters ==
The order has chartered 285 clubs or chapters in the United States, Canada, Australia, New Zealand, Malaysia and South Africa. In 2025, it had 29 active clubs and thirteen colonies or rebuilding clubs.

== Notable members ==
- James E. Defebaugh, Michigan House of Representatives
- Warren G. Harding, president of the United States
- John Kaul, timberman
- Albert Kuhn, lumberman
- Hamilton Love, lumberman, sportswriter, and humorist
- Alfred Pettibone, businessman
- Theodore Roosevelt, president of the United States

== See also ==
- Alexandria Hoo Hoos
- List of general fraternities
- New Zealand Timber Museum – Museum in Putāruru, New Zealand
- Orange Hoo–Hoos
