= Adele Schulenburg Gleeson =

American sculptor

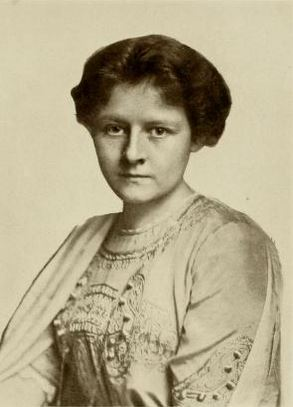
- Gleeson in 1914
- Born: January 18, 1883; St. Louis, Missouri
- Died: 1964 (aged 80–81); East Haddam, Connecticut
- Occupation: Sculptor

Adele Schulenburg Gleeson (January 18, 1883 – 1971) was an American sculptor active in Missouri and Connecticut. She shared a studio with Nancy Coonsman and specialized in "vigorous" bas reliefs for St. Louis and New York City buildings.

== Early life ==
Adele E. Schulenburg was born on January 18, 1883, in St. Louis, the daughter of August Wilhelm Schulenburg (1843–1916) and Adele Mallinckrodt (1851–1937). She had two sisters, Eleanor Schulenburg Bausch (1872–1955) and Agnes M. Schulenburg Schaberg (1874–1951), and one brother, Gustavus Otto Schulenburg (1878–1951). Her maternal grandfather was Emil Mallinckrodt (1806–1892), a prolific writer whose sons, Gustave, Eduard and Otto, founded G. Mallinckrodt Chemical, St. Louis, in 1867.

Adele Schulenburg, together with her friend Nancy Coonsman studied under George Julian Zolnay. After finishing a four-year course in the St. Louis School of Fine Arts of Washington University in St. Louis, Schulenburg opened a studio in St. Louis for one year. Schulenburg then studied in Philadelphia with Charles Grafly.

Schulenburg and Coonsman went abroad to study sculpture in the secessionist private school of Arthur Wilhelm Otto Lewin-Funcke, of Berlin. There Schulenburg remained for one year and a half, touring Germany, Paris, Dresden, Munich, Italy and other places at the end of her studies before returning home.

== Career ==
Coming home from Europe, Adele Schulenburg opened a studio on Grand Avenue and Morgan Street, St. Louis, and Coonsman worked with her in the same studio, although each filled her own commissions and had her individual line of work.

Schulenburg made portraits, sketches, reliefs, statuettes, busts, fountains, and architectural designs. She specialized in "vigorous" bas reliefs for St. Louis and New York City buildings. She did a portrait of Edward Mallinckrodt, "a fine breathing likeness", and a group of the Rombauer children, "lifelike and clear". The "Incense Burner" was one of her best pieces and many copies of this had been made in bronze and terracotta.

=== Exhibitions ===
- 1909, Alaska–Yukon–Pacific Exposition, a world's fair held in Seattle, publicizing the development of the Pacific Northwest.
- from 1911 to 1930, regular exhibitor to the Pennsylvania Academy of the Fine Arts Annual Exhibition, from 1911 to 1928 as "Adele Schulenburg" and in 1930 as "Adele Gleeson". In 1914 her work was given extra notice; she presented two sculptures, Portrait Sketch of Mrs. Mallery and Child, commissioned by Atto Mallery, and Scrub Woman. In 1915 she presented another sculpture, Portrait: Susie.
- from October 4 to November 1, 1915, St. Louis Public Library, with Nancy Coonsman. One of the exhibits by Coonsman was later presented to the Library.
- 1916, Art Institute of Chicago.
- May 1917, Saint Louis Art Museum, sculptures by Schulenburg and etchings by C.K. Gleeson.

== Personal life ==
Schulenburg lived, among other places, in St. Louis, Missouri (3213 Russell Avenue and 4518 Cote Brilliant Avenue), Kirkwood, Missouri (115 Edwin Avenue), East Haddam, Connecticut and Colchester, Connecticut.

On October 31, 1914, Schulenburg married Charles K. Gleeson, another artist. Charles Gleeson was born in St. Louis on March 5, 1878, the son of John Gleeson and Rose Mullen. He studied at the St. Louis School of Fine Arts from 1904 to 1907, at the Art Students League of New York in 1908, and at the Académie Colarossi and the Académie de la Grande Chaumière in Paris from 1909 to 1910. In both years he exhibited etchings at the Paris Salon. He then became the Art instructor at the Central High School in St. Louis. They had two children: Rosamund Elsbeth and Karl Kinsheleah.

Schulenburg died in 1964 at East Haddam, Connecticut.
