= Kaulton, Alabama =

- Ghost town
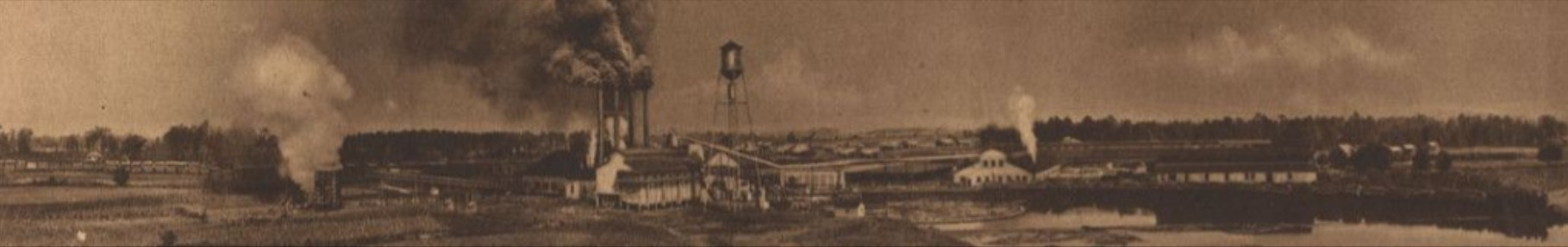
- 1915 Panorama of Kaulton

- Location within Alabama
- Coordinates: 33°11′00″N 87°34′10″W
- Country: United States
- State: Alabama
- County: Tuscaloosa
- Elevation: 157 ft (48 m)
- Time zone: UTC-6 (Central (CST))
  - Summer (DST): UTC-5 (CDT)
- Area codes: 205, 659
- GNIS feature ID: 148288

Kaulton is a ghost town formerly located in Tuscaloosa County, Alabama, United States.

== History ==
Kaulton was founded in 1912 to serve as the location for Kaul Lumber Company's new mill after the mill in Hollins closed. John Kaul hired Boston architect George Miller, who laid out plans for the city of Corey, to design Kaulton using Beaux-Arts principles. Kaulton had houses for workers, a hotel, churches, a school, parks, and offices. The entire complex covered over eighty acres.

The houses were designed with four rooms, two chimneys, and water, sewage, and electrical access. Though planned with good intentions, the houses constructed were poorly designed and cheaply made. Even so, Kaulton was described as "a model industrial town, with homes, not cabins, for the housing of the workmen and their families, and with every community service emphasized and encouraged." The company awarded prizes for the best vegetable garden, and there were ball fields, playgrounds, and a company physician provided. John Kaul died in 1931, and the Kaul Lumber mill closed later that year. With that, Kaulton began to fall into decline. The Kaul Lumber Company ceased timber sales, but continued to derive income from renting houses and other buildings at Kaulton. The area occupied by the former town now lies within the city limits of Tuscaloosa, but the name Kaulton is still used in Kaulton Field and Old Kaulton Road. Most of the records relating to the town were destroyed by Kaul Lumber Company, but some records of the town and the company are kept at the Birmingham Public Library.

Kaulton had its own baseball team, which played the University of Alabama Summer School Team, among other opponents.
