= George Julian Zolnay =

Hungarian sculptor (1863–1949)

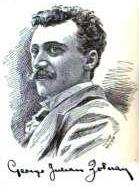
- Born: July 4, 1863; Bucharest, United Principalities of Moldavia and Wallachia
- Died: May 1, 1949 (aged 85); New York City
- Education: Karl Storck, William-Adolphe Bouguereau, Alexandre Falguière, Edmund von Hellmer, Carl Kundmann
- Known for: sculpture

George Julian Zolnay (Gyula Zsolnay) (July 4, 1863 – May 1, 1949) was a Romanian, Hungarian, and American sculptor called the "sculptor of the Confederacy".

== Early years ==
Zolnay was born on July 4, 1863, to Ignác (Ignatius) Zolnay, originally from Pécs, and Carolina Vagán Zolnay, from Bucharest. His father Ignác had served with General Józef Bem during the Hungarian Revolution of 1848. By 1849 Ignác, co-owner of the famed Zsolnay Porcelaine Manufacturer, had sold his interest and moved from Pécs, Kingdom of Hungary, to Bucharest, Wallachia. Zolnay's birthplace is usually identified as Bucharest, though some mention Pécs.

He grew up in Bucharest, attending the Saint Sava National College. As George's talents in the arts were noticed in his childhood, he initially wanted to become a violinist, attaining a scholarship at the Music and Drama Conservatory; his father's disapproval kept him from violin, but he did learn to appreciate art. At age twenty he assumed a brief career as a cadet in the Romanian cavalry regiments, where he modelled many military objects and individuals. At his father's wish, he entered the civil service upon leaving the military, but decided to learn sculpting on the side.

His father finally impressed by one of his sculptures, Zolnay studied and graduated from the National School of Fine Arts of Bucharest where he learned under Karl Stork. He then went to Paris, France to study under William-Adolphe Bouguereau and Alexandre Falguière, as then to the Imperial Academy of Fine Arts of Vienna where he studied under Edmund von Hellmer and Carl Kundmann, and received a Grand Prix for his work. His high ranking at Vienna gave him a grant for his own art studio, and a cash allowance.

== "Sculptor of the Confederacy" ==
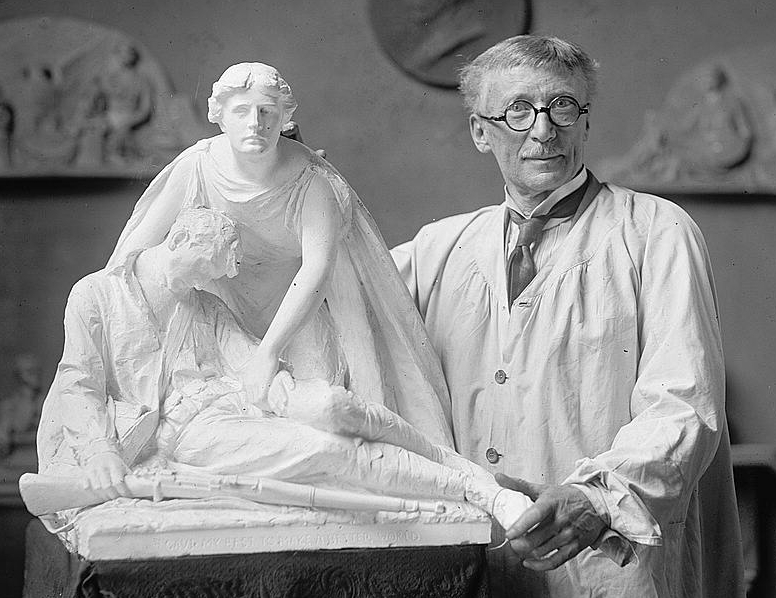
George Julian Zolnay

Zolnay came to the United States in 1893 to attend the World's Columbian Exposition, at the behest of the U.S. consul-general to Vienna. He intended to return home, but chose New York City for his new home in 1894, eventually becoming an American citizen.

He became a favorite sculptor of Southerners in 1897 after he sculpted a statue of Sam Davis, a Confederate spy who was executed; as no pictures of Davis survived, Zolnay based the likeness on Davis' relatives. Zolnay's numerous creations, scattered throughout the South, earned him the name "Sculptor of the Confederacy."

In 1898 Zolnay was one of the eight men led by Charles DeKay who founded the National Arts Club, becoming its first vice-president.

Zolnay was first described as the "sculptor of the Confederacy" as early as July 1899, in a Brooklyn Daily Eagle article about the Jefferson Davis memorial. He'd already "received so many commissions from the South" to earn the name, which was repeated in subsequent coverage. The widow of Jefferson Davis and former First Lady of the Confederate States, Varina Davis, had moved to New York City that same year, and was quoted in the article with kind words for Zolnay, with whom she'd collaborated for six months on the statue. For verisimilitude, she'd loaned Zolnay the clothes in which Davis had been captured.

Family sources and Zolnay's biographer describe his friendship with Varina Davis, and access to the social circle she'd built in New York City, as the foundation of a whole phase of his American career, his "Confederate Period", from 1899 to 1923.

== St. Louis, Washington, D.C. ==
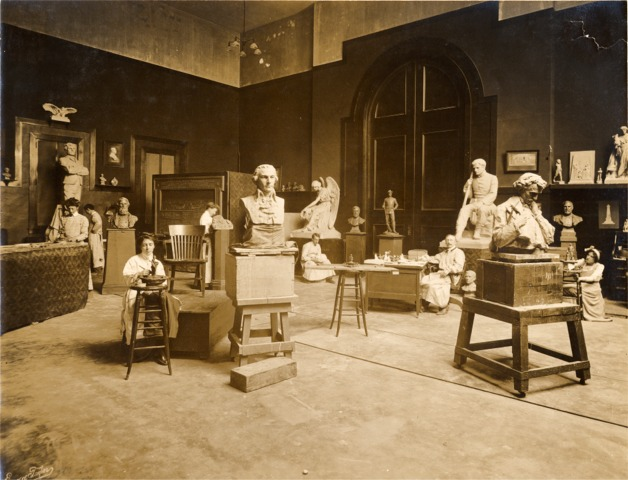
Zolnay at the Art Academy of People's University, with students including Caroline Risque and Nancy Coonsman

In 1903 Zolnay moved to St. Louis to head the sculpture department of the St. Louis School of Fine Arts, taking the place of Robert P. Bringhurst, and teaching there several years while continuing to pursue commissions, many in the south. Among Zolnay's students in St. Louis were Caroline Risque, Nancy Coonsman, and Adele Schulenburg Gleeson. As of November 19, 1903, Zolnay was the instructor of modeling at the school, curator of sculpture in its associated Museum of Fine Arts, and had just been appointed to the three-man board overseeing the Art Department at the 1904 Louisiana Purchase Exposition, a role in which he would report to Halsey Ives, who had founded the school 20 years prior. Zolnay also contributed two significant figures for the Transportation Building at the fair.

In the same years Zolnay and his studio assistants received a large commission for the two eight-ton lion and tiger, to be placed on top of 40-foot columns, flanking the Delmar road entrance to newly-founded University City, Missouri, an inner suburb developed in parallel with the 1904 fair. Their client was the founder and first mayor of U. City, promoter and publisher Edward Gardner Lewis.

After the lion and tiger were completed in 1909, Zolnay left the St. Louis School of Fine Arts, and went to work for his client Lewis, taking at least two of his student proteges (Coonsman and Risque) along. Mr. Lewis was a font of interlocking schemes, on a national scale, and the head of a lucrative publishing empire. He made Zolnay the head of the sculptural program at the Art Academy of the People's University of the American Women's League, which meant contributing to an ongoing building program in U. City, devising sculptural education material suitable for correspondence courses, and designing a hearth sculpture a proposed national network of League chapter houses of the League, such as the completed example in the Katy Hamman-Stricker Library, Calvert, Texas.

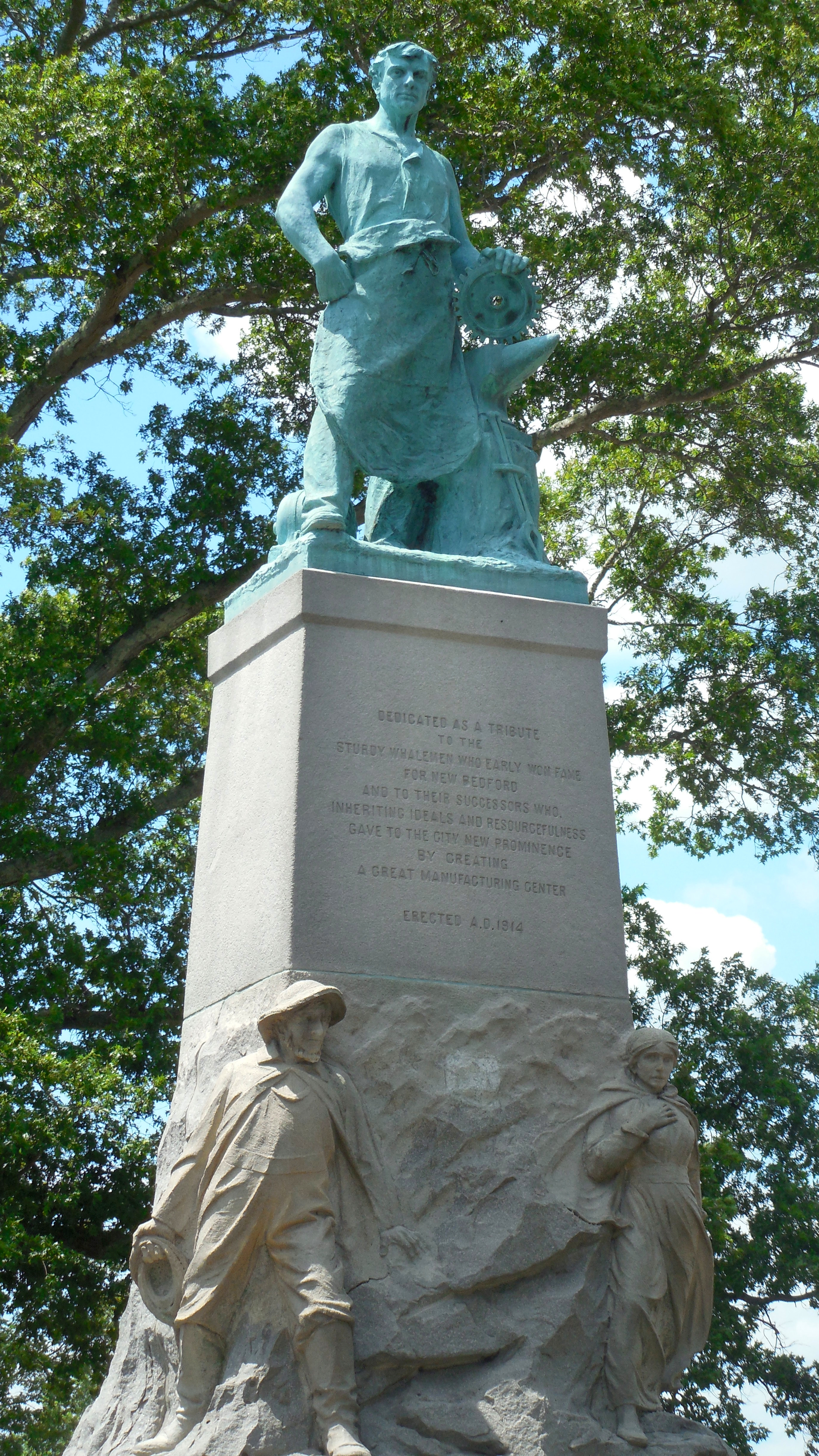
Barnard Monument at Buttonwood Park in New Bedford, Massachusetts

In 1913 Zolnay moved his studios to Washington, D.C. Beside his sculptural activity, and holding sculpture classes at the Zolnay Atelier, he also delivered lectures on Romania, illustrated with traditional Romanian music and by lantern slides, at the Smithsonian Institution and did illustration work for the two volumes of the book The Roumanians and Their Lands issued by the Roumanian Relief Committee of America in 1919.

== Personal life ==
Zolnay married Abigail (Abbie) Rowan Gillim on November 23, 1902. She was a Southerner; her parents had come from Ireland and settled in Kentucky. They had two daughters, Margaret and Elisabeth.

Zolnay died on May 1, 1949, at his residence on the Upper East Side of Manhattan.

== Legacy ==
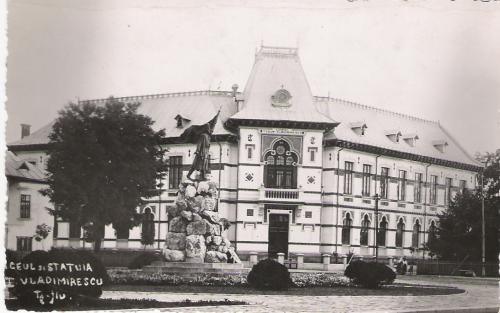
Statue of Tudor Vladimirescu in Târgu-Jiu

In 1902 while on a visit to Romania, he was received by King Carol I of Romania in a one-hour private audience at Peleș Castle in Sinaia. Later on the king awarded Zolnay the Knight's Cross of the Order of the Crown. His artistic legacy in Romania includes the statue of Tudor Vladimirescu in Târgu-Jiu and a bust of poet Grigore Alexandrescu.

The Zsolnay family have enriched the culture of the city of Pécs and added to its wealth. The artworks of successive generations can be seen everywhere from the facade of old and new houses, on roofs, on sculptures and reliefs, in shop-windows, on commemorative plaques. The sculpture of the Saracen boy decorating the fountain was made by George Zsolnay.

== Work ==
- modeling for the Parthenon replica in Nashville, figures for the Terminal Building and the Education and Hygiene Building, and other work, for the Tennessee Centennial and International Exposition, Centennial Park, Nashville, Tennessee, 1895
- fountain at the Trans-Mississippi and International Exposition, Omaha, 1898
- Ye Shall Know the Truth, and the Truth Shall Make You Free, stamped concrete pediment sculpture, Cabell Hall at the University of Virginia, Charlottesville, Virginia, 1898
- Jefferson Davis, bronze on granite pedestal, Hollywood Cemetery, Richmond, Virginia, 1899
- Angel of Grief, Varina Anne "Winnie" Davis Memorial, Hollywood Cemetery, Richmond, Virginia, 1899
- Confederate Monument, on the grounds of the Daviess County Courthouse, Owensboro, Kentucky, 1900
- concrete lions at the Gates of Opportunity and other work around the Woman's Magazine Building, University City, Missouri, 1903–09
- two seated figures for Transportation Building, and perhaps other work, at the 1904 Louisiana Purchase Exposition, St. Louis
- elaborate interior work with multiple caryatids and groups, James R. Browning United States Court of Appeals Building, San Francisco, for architect James Knox Taylor, 1905
- Nathaniel Parker Willis Monument, bronze, Oak Hill Cemetery, Crawfordsville, Indiana, 1909
- bronze Sam Davis Statue, Boy Hero of the Confederacy, on the grounds of the Tennessee State Capitol in Nashville, Tennessee, 1909
- Confederate Private Monument, Centennial Park, Nashville, Tennessee, dedicated 1909
- Hoo Hoo Monument, Gurdon, Arkansas, 1909
- Barnard Monument, Buttonwood Park Historic District, New Bedford, Massachusetts, 1914
- bronze Pierre Laclède, grounds of City Hall, St. Louis, 1914
- Memorial to the Confederate Dead, Forest Park, St. Louis, 1914 (removed 2017)
- frieze, Central High School (now Cardozo Senior High School), Washington DC, 1916
- Statue of Sequoyah, an Oklahoma entry for the National Statuary Hall Collection, a commission inherited from sculptor Vinnie Ream after her death, 1917
- bronze, Dr. Andrew Taylor Still, A.T. Still University, Kirksville, Missouri, 1917
- Kiwanis Memorial in Centennial Park (Nashville), 1923
- bust of Confederate veteran Edmund William Cole, Kirkland Hall, administration building of Vanderbilt University, Nashville
- bronze bust of Edgar Allan Poe, University of Virginia, Charlottesville, Virginia
- bas relief on Vinnie Ream's grave monument, Arlington National Cemetery.

== Gallery ==
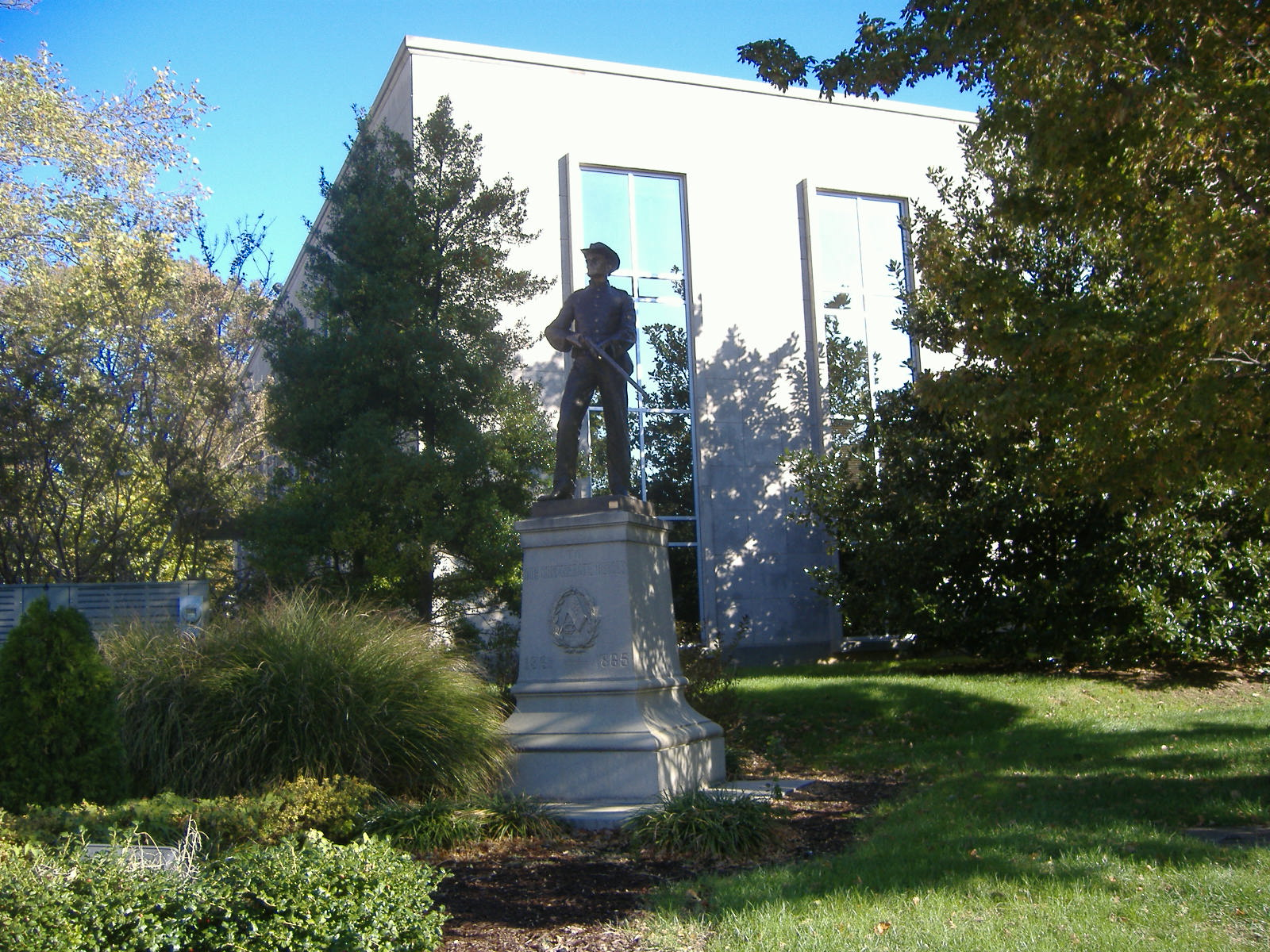
Zolnay statue at Owensboro, Kentucky

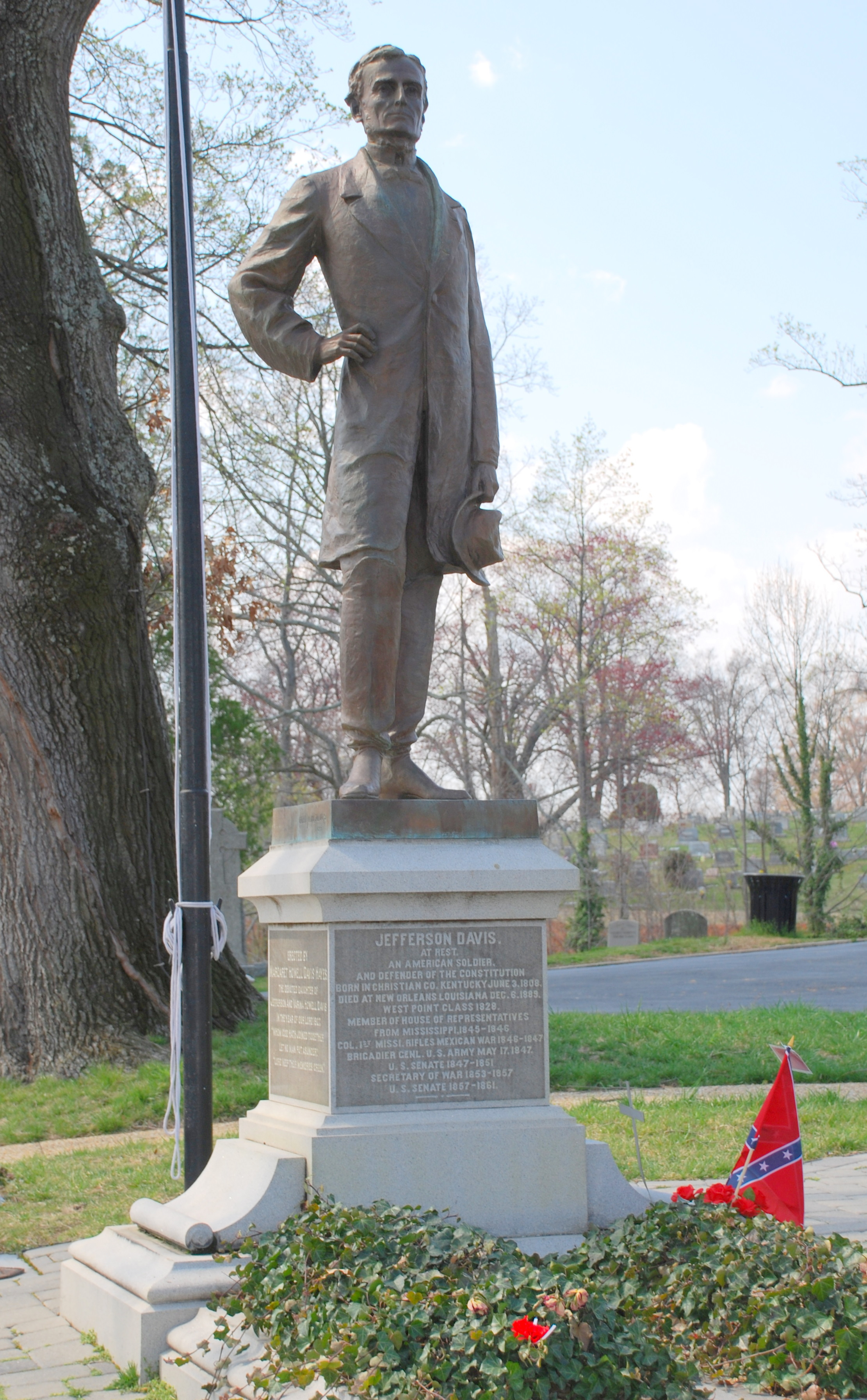
Zolnay statue at Jefferson Davis' gravesite in Richmond, Virginia.

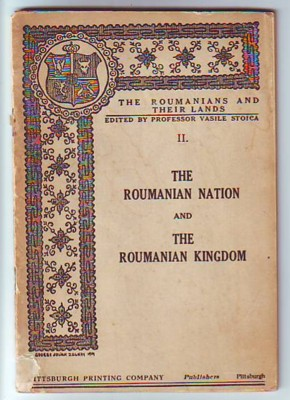
Book cover of The Roumanians and Their Lands
