= Buttonwood Park Zoo =

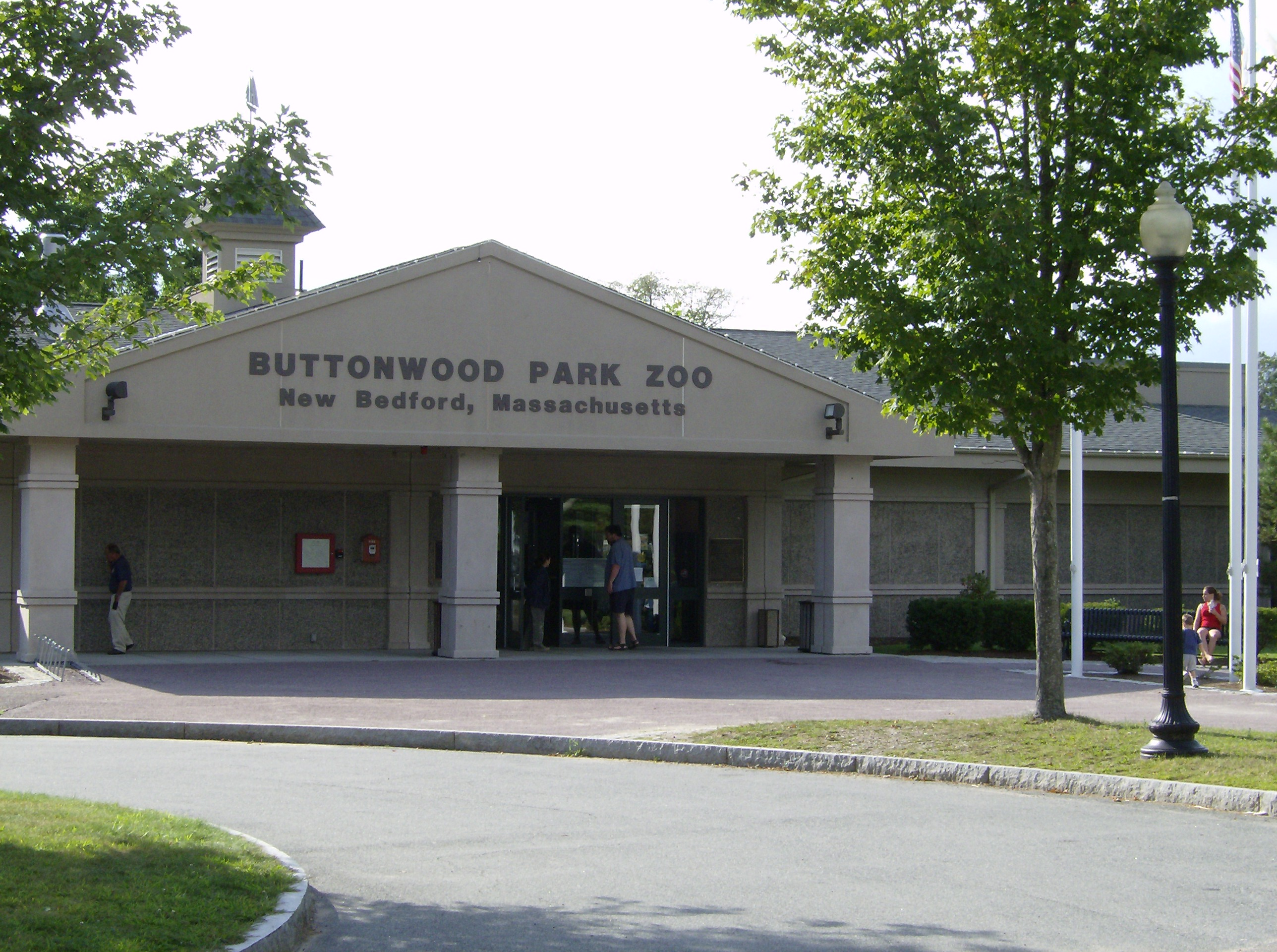
- The entrance to the Buttonwood Park Zoo
- Interactive map of Buttonwood Park Zoo
- 41.62996°N 70.95273°W
- Date opened: 1894; August 12, 2000 (renovated)
- Location: New Bedford, Massachusetts, United States
- No. of animals: 250+
- No. of species: 83
- Annual visitors: 222,000
- Memberships: AZA
- Website: www.bpzoo.org

The Buttonwood Park Zoo, located in New Bedford, Massachusetts, is a zoo located in the center of Buttonwood Park. Opened in 1894, it is the third-oldest zoo in New England and the 12th-oldest zoo in the United States. Located on a 7 acres (2.8 ha) campus, the zoo is owned and operated by the City of New Bedford, with the support of the Buttonwood Park Zoological Society. It is located on part of the Buttonwood Park Historic District, and federally designated on the National Register of Historic Places.

The zoo is home to more 250 different animals made up of more than 80 different species of animals, including many that are rare and endangered. The zoo has played a vital role in the conservation of endangered animals and is a participant in the Cape Cod Stranding Network and Species Survival Plan.

== History ==
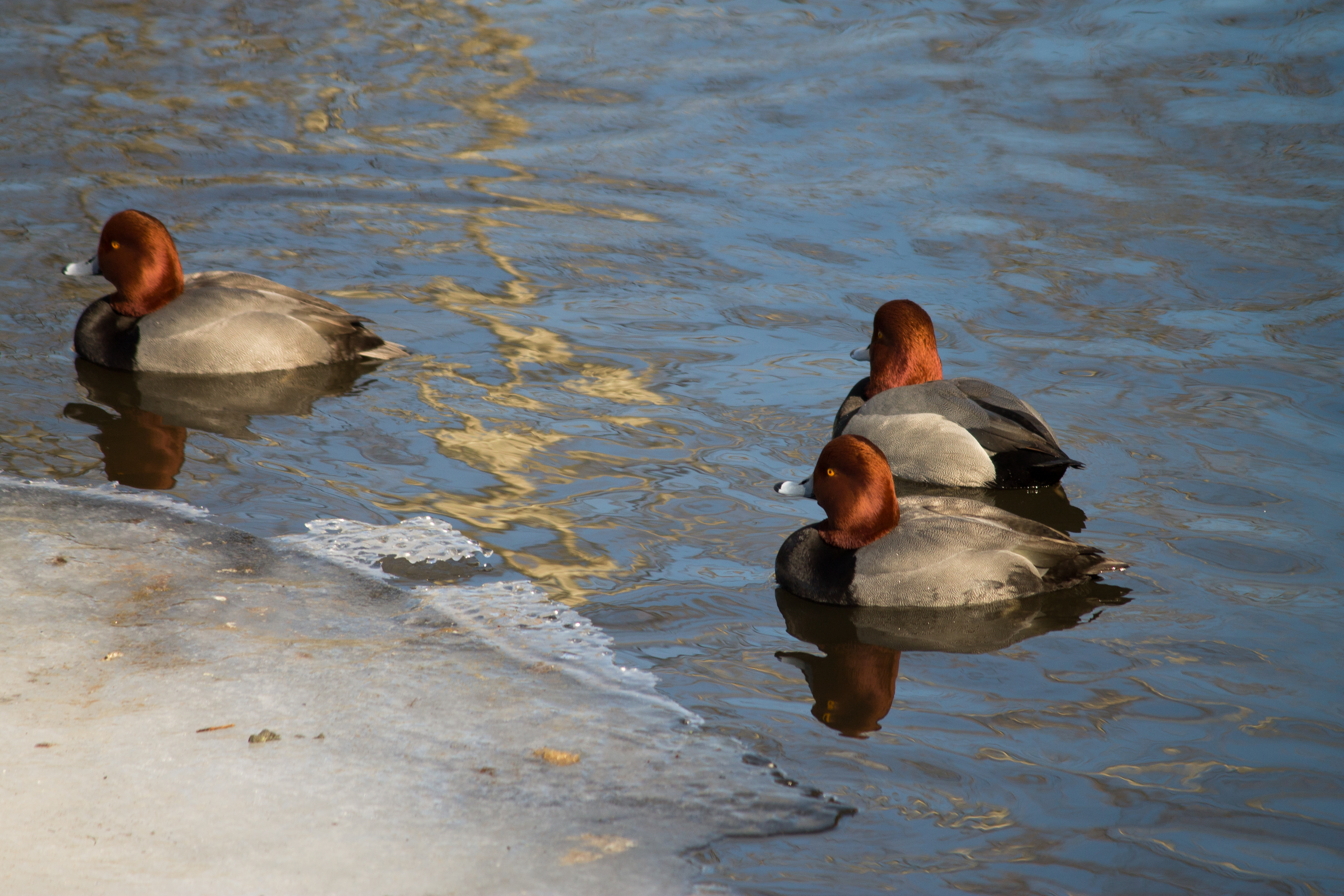
The Redhead Ducks exhibit

=== Early years ===
The land that would be used as the site of the Buttonwood Park Zoo was purchased by the city of New Bedford in 1892. In 1894, the Buttonwood Park Zoo was opened as a way to present New Bedford as a powerful and wealthy city. At the time of the zoo's founding, cities were not seen as world-class unless they had a zoo. During the summer of its opening, the zoo consisted primarily of native animals including black bears, foxes and deer. By 1912, the zoo expanded to include monkeys, elk and bison.

From 1935 to 1936, the Public Works Administration, as part of President Frank D. Roosevelt's New Deal, renovated the black bear den at the zoo. The back part of the stonewall, built by the PWA, in the bear den remains to this day. In the early 1960s, the zoo began to acquire exotic animals such as asian elephants, leopards, lions and wallabies.

The Greater New Bedford Zoological Society was founded in 1968. The organization's first project was to raise money to build a heated building.

The zoo haphazardly expanded and grew following the 1960s, but did not have comprehensive plans. New Bedford hired a number of architectural firms to develop the zoo, but the city failed to implement the plans. These challenges were accelerated by an economic recession in the 1990s. As a result, the condition of the zoo deteriorated and the zoo was facing large fines from the federal government. As part of a settlement with the federal government, the zoo agreed to close for renovations in 1995.

The zoo closed for renovations in November 1996 and reopened in 2000. The zoo was re-accredited by the prestigious Association of Zoos and Aquariums in 2003.

=== Recent years ===
The City of New Bedford owns and operates the zoo. The City of New Bedford funds staffing, operation, maintenance and capital improvements to facilities. Approximately $7,000,000 in Capital Improvement Program (CIP) bonds have been designated between 2014 and 2019 to update the facilities. Another $4,000,000 was funded by the Commonwealth of Massachusetts in 2018 for further improvements.

Buttonwood Park Zoo was called "one of the finest small zoos in the United States" by the American Zoo and Aquarium Association in 2003.

== Exhibits and attractions ==
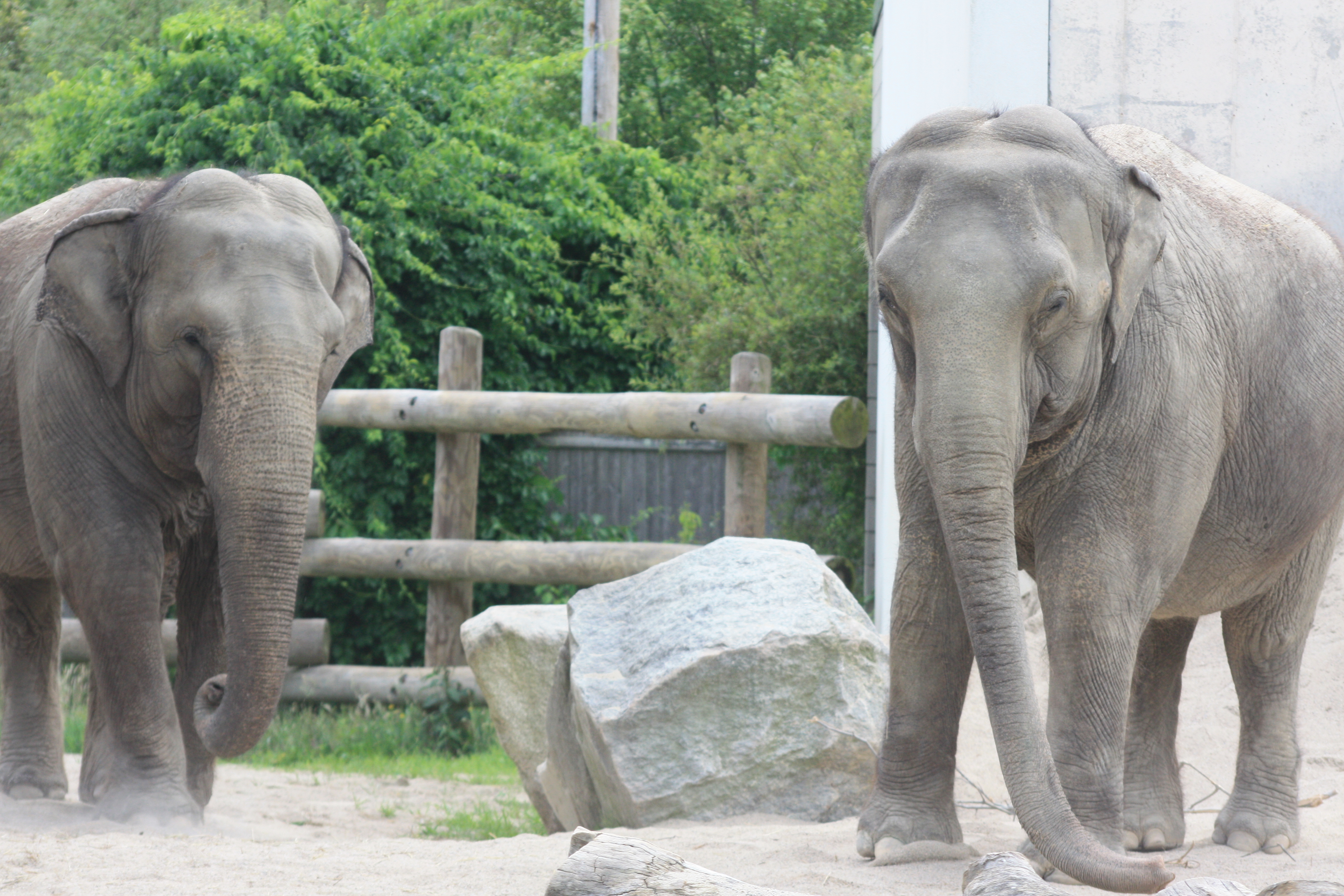
The herd of two Asian elephants, Ruth and Emily

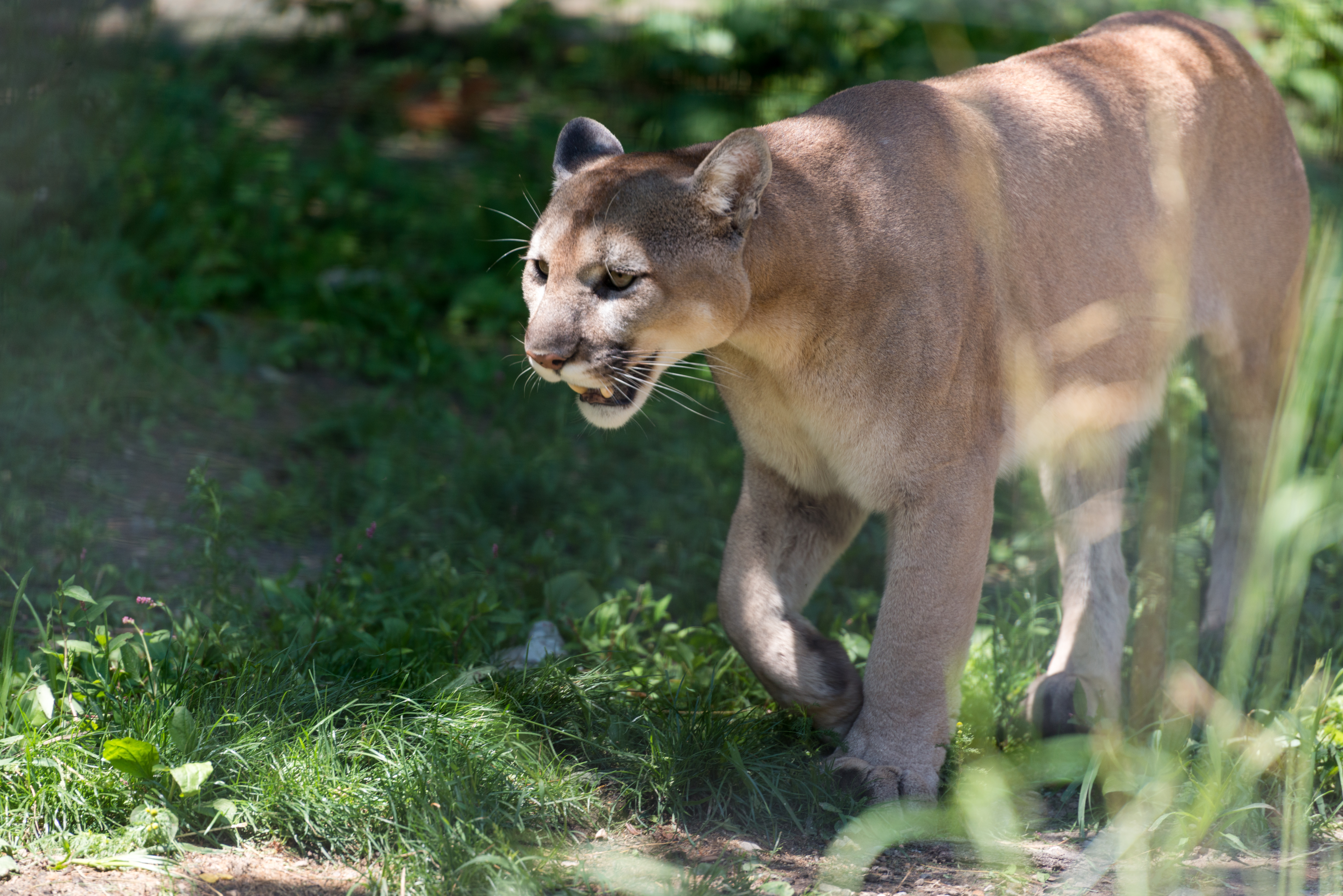
A mountain lion at the Buttonwood Park Zoo

The zoo houses more than 250 animal species from around the world. Exhibits feature both domestic and wild animals.

The zoo had two Asian elephants, Ruth and Emily. Emily arrived to the zoo in 1968. After being abused in a circus and abandoned in a trailer located in Danvers, Ruth arrived to the zoo in 1986. In 2013, the zoo announced that after the elephants die, it will not take in any other elephants to replace them, instead opting to get greater one-horned rhinos as part of its master plan. In 2024, the zoo announced that Ruth would enter hospice care at 66 years old. Ruth died in December 2024.

The exhibits are categorized into five main areas:

- North America East (NAE): This section contains black bears, river otters, beavers, turkey vultures, bald eagles, and a coyote.
- North America West (NAW): This section located beyond the entrance contains bison, wild turkeys, whitetail deer, cougars, Canadian lynx, bobcats, and common crows.
- Aquatics: This section contains harbor seals, shorebirds, exhibits replicating a salt marsh, a kettlepond, and a mountain stream, amphibians, snakes, and turtles.
- Rainforests, Rivers & Reefs: This indoor section contains animals from the tropical regions of Earth, like monkeys, birds, and reef fish.
- Elephants: This section contains the zoo's elephant named Emily. Nearby exhibits include red pandas and red-crowned cranes.
- Domestics: This section contains 2 horses,.
- Animal Ambassadors: This section will be housed in a new Animal Ambassador barn by Domestics, set to open in Spring of 2025. Currently they are housed behind the scenes and are used for programming, and include Virginia opossums, skunks, Madagascar hissing cockroaches and a prehensile-tailed skink.

=== Education ===
The Wildlife Education Center is an educational building at the heart of the zoo. It contains two classrooms which host educational programs and business and private meetings.

=== Events ===
Annual events at the zoo include "Boo at the Zoo", "Red, White, and Brew", "First Taste of Fall", and "Cookies, Paws, and Santa Claws".

=== Other features ===
The North Woods Gift Store and Bear's Den Cafe are open daily.
