= Alfred Pettibone =

American businessman (1835–1914)

Alfred W. Pettibone
- Born: March 14, 1835; Waldo, Ohio
- Died: September 2, 1914 (aged 79)
- Burial place: Bayview Cemetery, Bellingham, Whatcom County, Washington
- Education: Beloit College
- Occupations: Merchant; real estate businessman
- Years active: 1856 – c. 1890
- Organization: Concatenated Order of Hoo-Hoo
- Known for: Established real estate and trading businesses in Whatcom, Washington (Bellingham). Worked as a trader in Victoria and Langley, Canada as well as was one of the biggest local merchants in Lodi, Wisconsin.
- Political party: Republican
- Spouse: Lucy B. Peabody (married 1861) (or Flora Peabody)
- Children: 4
- Parents: Hiram R. Pettibone (father); Jane (Curtis) Pettibone (mother)

Alfred W. Pettibone (March 14, 1835 – September 2, 1914) was one of the first Bellingham, Washington residents and pioneers who actively participated in the city's formation, in particular developing the merchandise trade and real estate businesses.

Pettibone was the first to establish such businesses in Whatcom, Washington, which were developed with the help of his brother and sons. In the beginning of his career, he worked as a trader in Victoria and Langley, Canada, supplying international explorers, and then became one of the biggest local merchants in Lodi, Wisconsin, during the American Civil War.

The Pettibones' family house in Bellingham, built on Eldridge Avenue, later became one of the city's historic buildings.

== Early life, family and education ==
Pettibone was born on March 14, 1835, in Waldo, Ohio. His parents, lawyer Hiram R. Pettibone and Jane (Curtis) Pettibone, were both born in Grand Bay, Connecticut. Pettibone had a sister named Jennie A. Pettibone (later Krammer) and a brother, W. C. Pettibone. The Pettibone family was of French origin and went to Wales during the Huguenot troubles. In 1635, they settled in Connecticut.

Pettibone was educated in the public schools of Fremont, Ohio, and then went to Beloit, Wisconsin, where he took a six-year educational course at Beloit College.

== Career ==
=== Career in Wisconsin and Washington states ===
In 1856, Pettibone went to Portage, Wisconsin, where he worked as a clerk and eventually moved on to work in a trading business. In 1858, he moved to Whatcom County, Washington, travelling there on a number of steamers, including the John L. Stevens and the Oregon.

Pettibone arrived in Whatcom (later Bellingham, Washington) during a time of Fraser Canyon Gold Rush and mass immigration to the Fraser River district. Later, taking advantage of the abandoned Whatcom Trail, a gold seekers' route, Pettibone erected a building with his brother there (on the site where the Whatcom Hotel was later built). They started to work as merchants, selling around $42,000 ($1,116,000 in 2020 dollars (Note: The approximate value converted to 2020 dollars, based on a standard adjustment of the 1913 dollar value using the Consumer Price Index as calculated by United States Department of Labor.)) worth of goods in the first five weeks. At the time, the city was under control of the Hudson's Bay Company and Governor Douglass, who forced the Pettibones to move their enterprise to Victoria, Canada.

=== Business in British Columbia and in Wisconsin during the Civil War ===
For some time, the Pettibones worked in Victoria, and later opened a branch firm in Langley, a city on the Fraser River. Their business as suppliers for international explorers ran until 1860. When it closed, the brothers returned to Wisconsin, where Pettibone did business in Lodi, becoming one of the biggest local merchants during the Civil War. Around 1864, Pettibone moved to Ripon, Wisconsin, and continued his merchant business. His son, Fred Curtis, joined him in 1879. The Pettibones stopped working in merchandise in 1883.

=== Real estate business in Bellingham ===
In 1883, Pettibone came back to Whatcom, becoming one of the first residents of Bellingham and an active participant in the city's life. There, he decided to enter the real estate business, and the firm Pettibone, Powell & Pettibone was opened–the first official real estate company in the city. This firm closed in 1884, but in 1890, a new one was formed under the name of Powell & Pettibone. Some years later, Pettibone fully retired from the business.

== Personal life and death ==
In June, 1861, Pettibone married Lucy B. Peabody (in a later article, Flora Peabody) . She was born in Cleveland, Ohio, lived in Whatcom, and died at Ripon in 1882. They had four children: Alice, married to a railroad constructor T. H. Bacon; Fred Curtis of Whatcom, married to Elizabeth E. Pettibone (Crickett); Will E. of Seattle; and Louis A. of St. Paul. The Pettibones were one of the Peabody heirs, and in 1886, after a series of legal disputes over land in Bellingham, they built a family home in the heart of the city on Eldridge Avenue. The house was later named historic building.

Alfred Pettibone's Historical House

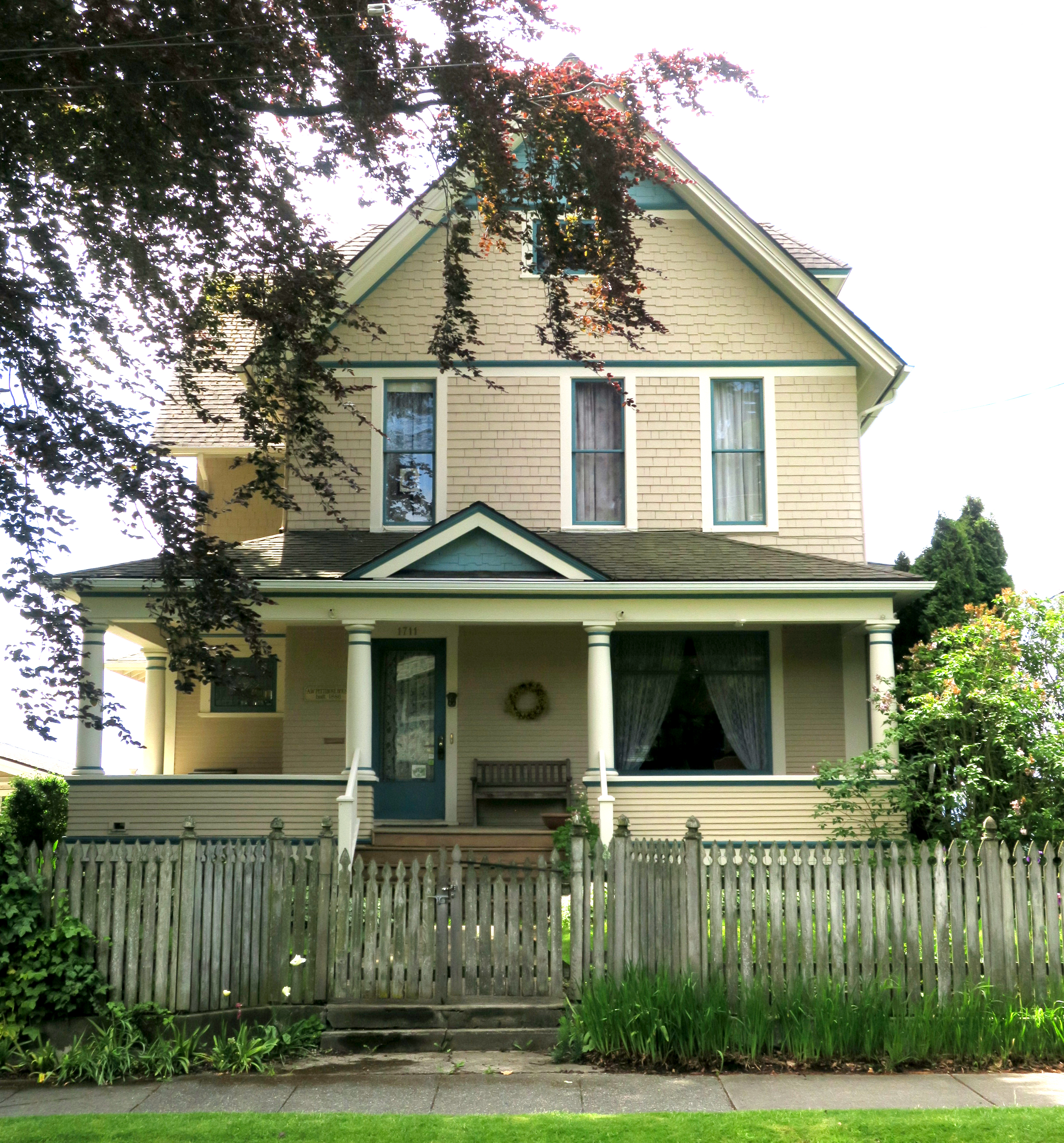

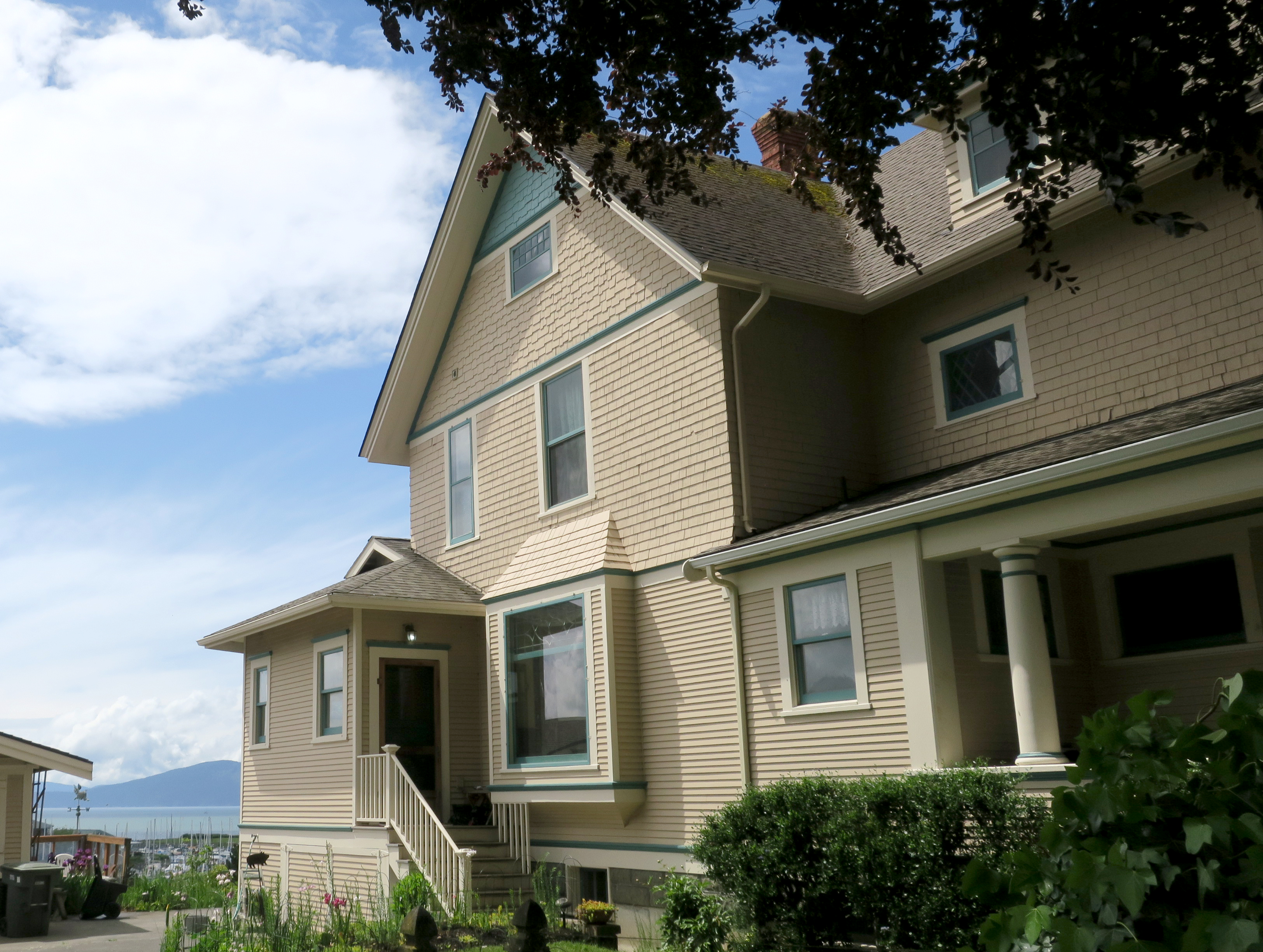

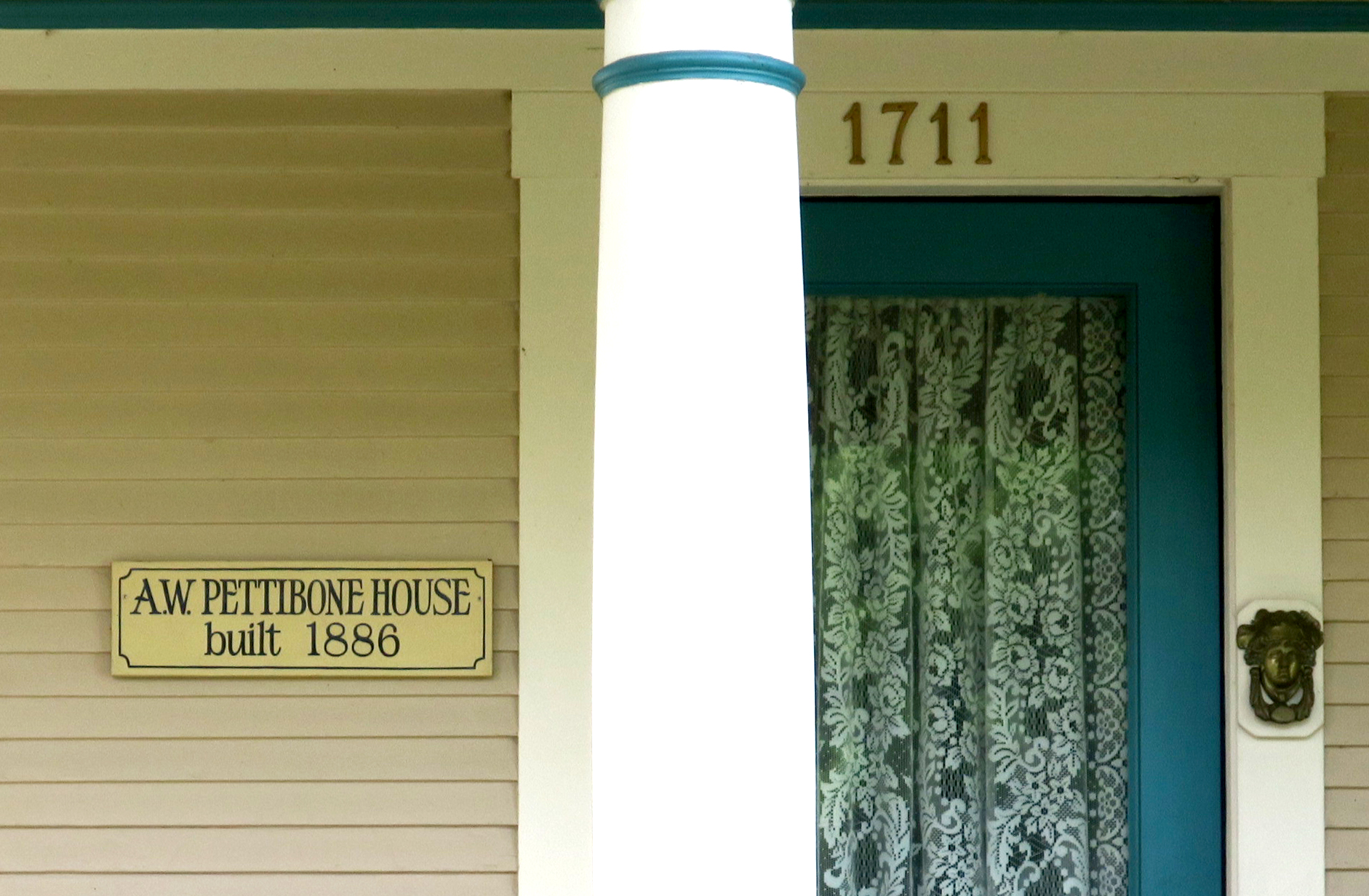

Pettibone's sons followed their father's steps, and in 1889 opened their own successful real estate office in Whatcom (later Bellingham) under the name of Pettibone Brothers Abstract Company. In 1892, they purchased an international shingle mill, and later owned 200 cattle and 75 horses.

Pettibone was a Republican and belonged to the Episcopal Lutheran church. He was a member of the Masonic fraternity, connected to the Ripon Commandery No. 10, K. T., of Berlin, Wisconsin, and to the Hoo Hoos.

Alfred Pettibone died on September 2, 1914, at the age of 79. He was buried in Bayview Cemetery, Bellingham.

== Literature cited ==
- "CPI Inflation Calculator", Bureau of Labor Statistics, Washington: United States Department of Labor
- "Domestic manufactures", Wisconsin State Register, Portage: S. S. Brannan, p. 2, October 3, 1863, ISSN 2577-7572, OCLC 12739610
- "Died: Pettibone", Wisconsin State Register, Portage: S. S. Brannan, p. 3, May 31, 1873, ISSN 2577-7572, OCLC 12739610
- "Obituary", Wisconsin State Register, Portage: S. S. Brannan, p. 3, December 10, 1881, ISSN 2577-7572, OCLC 12739610
- "Welcome arrivals", Wisconsin State Register, Portage: S. S. Brannan, p. 3, July 19, 1884, ISSN 2577-7572, OCLC 12739610
- Moy, Kristina; Guevara, Natalie, eds. (March 23, 1892), "Blaine news", Seattle Post-Intelligencer, New York City: Hearst Communications, p. 3, ISSN 2379-7304, LCCN sn83045604, OCLC 9563195
- "Fred C. Pettibone", Portage Daily Democrat, Portage: J. E. Jones, p. 2, May 27, 1907, LCCN sn85041052, OCLC 12589990
- "Fred C. Pettibone", Portage Daily Democrat, Portage: J. E. Jones, p. 3, May 27, 1907, LCCN sn85041052, OCLC 12589990
- Curley, Rob, ed. (August 29, 1910), "Rain begins falling", The Spokesman-Review, Spokane: Cowles Company, p. 5, ISSN 2690-7178, LCCN 2020218544, OCLC 61313128
- "A. W. Pettibone dies at Bellingham", Portage Daily Democrat, Portage: J. E. Jones, p. 3, September 11, 1914, LCCN sn85041052, OCLC 12589990
- Official docket for proposed revision to rail carrier noise emission regulation, vol. 1–2, Washington, D.C.: United States Environmental Protection Agency, July 1, 1979, OCLC 41709578
- Chapin, Aaron Lucius (January 1, 1849), First annual report of the trustees of Beloit College, Beloit: Beloit College, OCLC 85798157
- Hunt, Herbert; Kaylor, Floyd C. (1917), Washington, west of the Cascades; historical and descriptive; the explorers, the Indians, the pioneers, the modern, Chicago: S. J. Clarke Publishing Company, LCCN 18015511, OCLC 10086413
- Prosser, William Farrand (1903), Lewis, Edward Gardner (ed.), A history of the Puget Sound country, its resources, its commerce and its people, New York City: Edward Gardner Lewis, LCCN 05013767
- Warda, Gretchen Ann Wernecke (2002), Bible records from Wisconsin Dames, Wisconsin: Wisconsin Dames, OCLC 52474340
