= Hoo-Hoo Monument =

Fraternal monument in Gurdon, Arkansas, US

- U.S. National Register of Historic Places
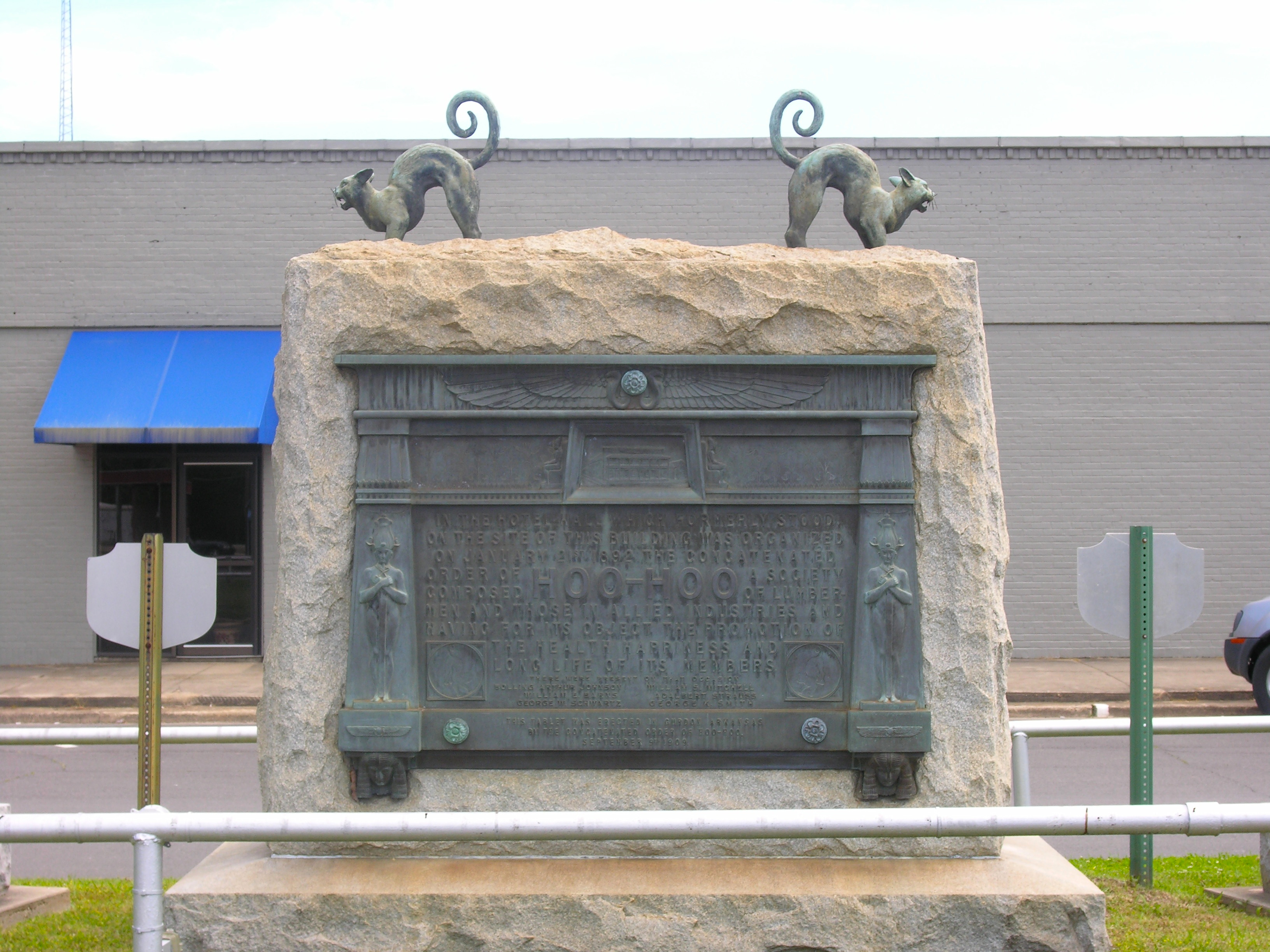

- Location within Arkansas Location within the United States
- Location: First St., Gurdon, Arkansas
- Coordinates: 33°55′13″N 93°9′14″W
- Area: less than one acre
- Built: 1909
- Architect: George J. Zolnay
- Architectural style: Egyptian Revival
- NRHP reference No.: 94000821
- Added to NRHP: September 2, 1999

The Hoo-Hoo Monument on First Street in Gurdon, Arkansas, is a commemoration of the creation of the Concatenated Order of Hoo-Hoo. The Hoo-Hoo is a fraternal society of lumbermen that was founded in Gurdon in 1892. The monument was designed by George Julian Zolnay. It was listed on the National Register of Historic Places in 1999.

== History ==
The Concatenated Order of Hoo-Hoo is an international fraternal society of lumbermen that was established in Gurdon, Arkansas in 1892. In 1909, the Concatenated Order of Hoo-Hoo commissioned George Julian Zolnay to create two bronze plaques to commemorate its founding. The plaques were made from copper pennies that were donated by members. The plaques were originally affixed to the exterior of a building on the site of the former Hotel Hall in Gurdon.

In 1927, the building was demolished, and the plaques were relocated to a granite monument and were rededicated. The monument is located on North First Street, near the Hoo-Hoo international headquarters and the Hoo-Hoo International and Forestry Museum on Main Street.

The monument was listed on the National Register of Historic Places on September 2, 1999.

== Description ==
The plaques were designed in the Egyptian Revival style by George Julian Zolnay and placed in 1909.

The Hoo-Hoo Monument consists of an ashlar-faced barre granite block with a bronze plaque on two sides. The granite block is 116 inches high, 107 inches wide, and 44 inches deep. The stone is topped with two bronze snarling black cats, with tails curled to form the number nine; these are replicas of the Hoo-Hoo emblem. The maker of the stone and cats is unknown.

The plaques were made in 1909 by George Julian Zolnay and are in Egyptian Revival, modeling symbols of the organizations. The plaques are topped by a prominent cavetto cornice with a winged sun-disc. The pediment has the image of a two-headed bird. The cornice is flanked by twin figures of Ramses. One plaque features the names of the organization's founders, an image of the Hotel Hall, and the organization's purpose: "the promotion of the health, happiness, and long life of its members." The other plaque lists the names of the Snarks of the Universe (president of the Concatenated Order of Hoo-Hoo) through 1988.

Two smaller granite stones were added on each side of the monument, bearing plaques with the names of presidents since 1988.

== See also ==
- National Register of Historic Places listings in Clark County, Arkansas
