= Confederate Private Monument =

Sculpture of a Confederate soldier in Nashville, Tennessee

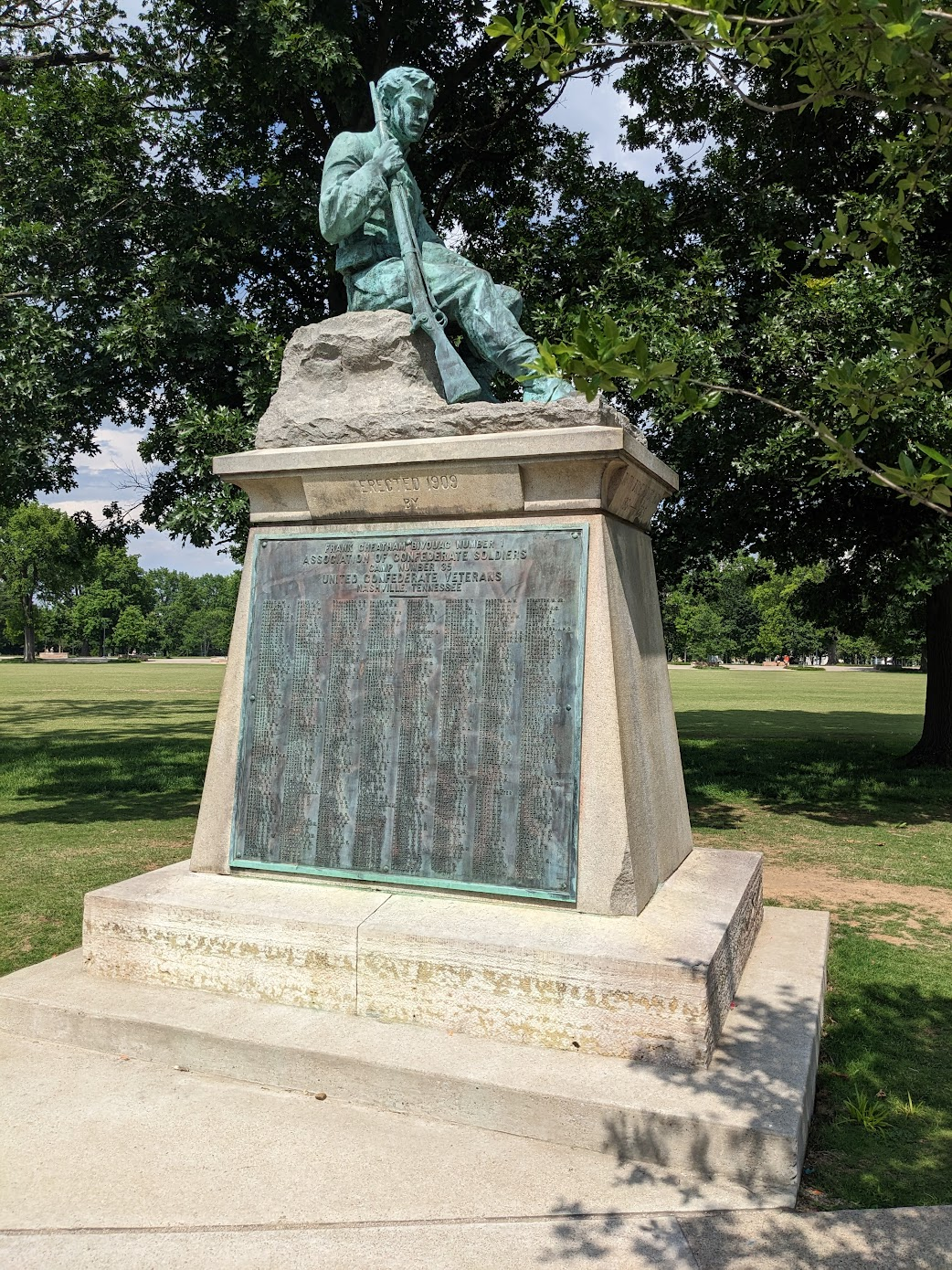

- Location within Tennessee Location within the United States
- Artist: George Julian Zolnay
- Year: 1909
- Medium: Bronze sculpture
- Location: Nashville, Tennessee, United States; 36°8′52.37″N 86°48′45.39″W

The Confederate Private Monument is a bronze sculpture of a private of the Confederate States Army in Centennial Park, Nashville, Tennessee, United States. Designed by George Julian Zolnay, it was commissioned by the Frank Cheatham Bivouac of the United Confederate Veterans in 1903, laid with Masonic honors in 1907, and dedicated in 1909. It was vandalized in June 2019.

== Description ==
The monument consists of a statue of a Confederate private in a uniform with a rifle. According to the Smithsonian Institution, the private is Sam Davis (although newspaper articles published at the time do not mention him). The Smithsonian adds, "The butt of the rifle rests on the rocky stone ledge on which Davis is seated. He faces forward with his proper left hand resting between his knees. Davis is seated on a rough-cut stone atop a tapering base." The monument includes a plaque with the names of 540 members of the Frank Cheatham Bivouac.

== History ==
Theodore Cooley, a member of the Frank Cheatham Bivouac of the United Confederate Veterans, suggested commissioning a monument in 1902. By 1903, he assembled a group of Confederate veterans to work on the project, and they hired sculptor George Julian Zolnay, who had designed many other Confederate sculptures, to do it. When Cooley died, Major B. M. Hord became the chairman of the committee.

The monument cost $4,000 to build. Zolnay donated $500; the Frank Cheatham Bivouac of the United Confederate Veterans raised $1000, the United Daughters of the Confederacy raised more than $1,000, and the rest was covered by smaller donors. By 1907, the cornerstone was "laid with Masonic honors by the Grand Lodge of the State." The monument also includes a plaque with the names of 540 members of the Frank Cheatham Bivouac.

The monument's dedication ceremony on June 19, 1909

The monument was dedicated in Centennial Park on June 19, 1909. Henry Watterson gave a speech that celebrated Tennessee for having the courage to leave the Union and stated "Greece had its Marathon; let Shiloh, Murfreesboro and Chichamauga tell the story of Tennessee." Zolnay gave a speech in front of the crowd highlighting that his wife was a Southerner, and Judge S. F. Wilson gave another speech about the fighting spirit of the private soldier in the CSA. It was "unveiled in the presence of an immense crowd of people," to the sound of "Dixie".

In a speech, Henry Watterson combined a veneration of Southern glory with a consecration of the dead to the reconciliation of the living. Although he emphasized divine will, he differed from other United Confederate Veteran speakers in that he depicted God sacrificing the men of both sections to a new Union. Through veneration of things memorable, magnificent, and courageous, he aroused feelings of pride, patriotism, and loyalty to the new Union. In appealing to things memorable, he transferred elements of the Gospels to Southern history to heighten the sense of divine destiny in reconciliation. He recounted the magnificence and courage of Tennesseans to highlight their conduct in war and their conciliatory spirit in peace.

== Vandalism ==
The statue was vandalized with red paint on June 17, 2019. The vandal(s) also painted "THEY WERE RACISTS" on the plaque with the names of the 540 Confederate veterans.
