= Hollins, Alabama =

- Census-designated place
- Location of Hollins in Clay County, Alabama.
- Coordinates: 33°07′35″N 86°07′38″W
- Country: United States
- State: Alabama
- County: Clay

Area
  - Total: 11.88 sq mi (30.76 km^{2})
  - Land: 11.85 sq mi (30.68 km^{2})
  - Water: 0.031 sq mi (0.08 km^{2})
- Elevation: 843 ft (257 m)

Population (2020)
  - Total: 517
  - Density: 43.6/sq mi (16.85/km^{2})
- Time zone: UTC-6 (Central (CST))
  - Summer (DST): UTC-5 (CDT)
- ZIP code: 35072
- Area codes: 256 & 938
- GNIS feature ID: 2582681

Hollins is a census-designated place and unincorporated community in southwest Clay County, Alabama, United States. Its population was 517 as of the 2020 census.

== History ==
Hollins is named after an official who worked for the Kaul Lumber Company. Hollins began when the Columbus and Western Railway reached the area in the late 1800s. In 1888, John Kaul bought out the Sample Lumber Company in Hollins and founded the Kaul Lumber Company. The large demand for lumber led to an increase in lumber jobs in Hollins. In addition to the Kaul Lumber headquarters and mill, Hollins was home to a hotel, several general stores, three churches, a school, and a cotton gin. Hollins was incorporated on February 21, 1893. In 1908, the Kaul Lumber mill burned and was rebuilt. In 1911, the mill was closed and was moved to Kaulton. The population began to decline, and Hollins' town charter was dissolved on September 25, 1919. A post office began operation under the name Hollins in 1887.

In 1890 and 1900, Hollins was the second largest community in Clay County after Ashland, the county seat. It reached its zenith of 688 persons in 1910 before its dissolution in 1919, but had fallen behind Lineville in importance to third place. With its recognition as a census-designated place in 2010, it has resumed its third-place position.

== Demographics ==
Historical population
Census	Pop.	Note	%±
1890	422		—
1900	238		−43.6%
1910	688		189.1%
2010	545		—
2020	517		−5.1%
U.S. Decennial Census

Hollins was listed as a census designated place in the 2010 U.S. census.

Hollins CDP, Alabama – Racial and ethnic composition Note: the US Census treats Hispanic/Latino as an ethnic category. This table excludes Latinos from the racial categories and assigns them to a separate category. Hispanics/Latinos may be of any race.
Race / Ethnicity (NH = Non-Hispanic)	Pop 2010	Pop 2020	% 2010	% 2020
White alone (NH)	487	462	89.36%	89.36%
Black or African American alone (NH)	42	26	7.71%	5.03%
Native American or Alaska Native alone (NH)	3	0	0.55%	0.00%
Asian alone (NH)	0	1	0.00%	0.19%
Native Hawaiian or Pacific Islander alone (NH)	0	0	0.00%	0.00%
Other race alone (NH)	0	0	0.00%	0.00%
Mixed race or Multiracial (NH)	9	14	1.65%	2.71%
Hispanic or Latino (any race)	4	14	0.73%	2.71%
Total	545	517	100.00%	100.00%
