= John Kaul =

American timberman

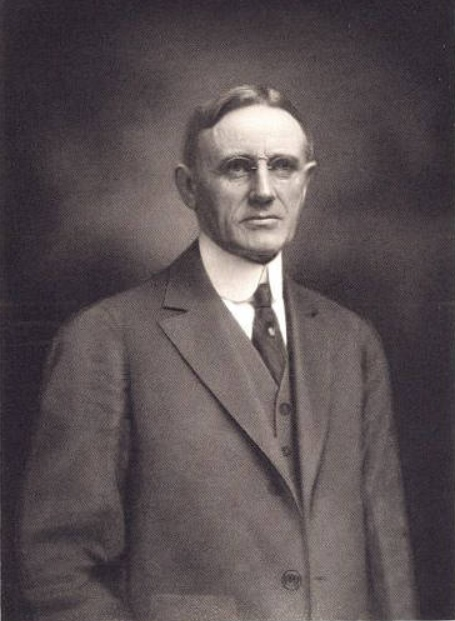
- Born: 1866; St. Marys, Pennsylvania, United States
- Died: 1931 (aged 64–65); Atlantic City, NJ
- Occupation: Businessman

John Lanzel Kaul (1866–1931) was an American businessman. He was involved in the timber industry and was a prominent figure in Birmingham, Alabama.

Kaul was born in St. Marys, Pennsylvania on October 9, 1866 to Andrew Kaul and Walburga (Lanzel) Kaul. He was a student at Rock Hill College in Baltimore, Maryland, and also took a business course at Eastman Business College in Poughkeepsie, New York. When he was 19 years old, Mr. Kaul started work at his father's lumber company, and in 1888 put in charge of the operation of the hardwood mill of the company. In 1889 he moved to the south to locate a yellow pine tract for operation, and he settled in Hollins, Alabama in 1890. He later moved to Birmingham, where he served as the president of Kaul Lumber Company.

Kaul served as president of the Southern Pine Association and was a pioneer in the activities to assure conservation of the national timber supply. He worked with Gifford Pinchot, then United States Forester, to greatly reduce practices that wasted wood. He also belonged to the National Lumberman's Committee on Forestry and was chairman of the Southern Pine Forestry Committee.

Kaul was a consistent Democrat, but he did not seek public office that would have distracted from his lumber manufacturing and sales interests. He served in a national capacity as a member of the American Commission to study rural credits in Europe; as a member of the State Board of Forestry, and as chairman of the Park Commission of the City of Birmingham.

During World War I, Kaul served as a member of the Southern Pine War Service Committee of the War Industries Board, and was also chairman of the Birmingham and Jefferson County Victory Loan Committees.

Kaul was a member of the Concatenated Order of Hoo-Hoo.

In an article entitled "Parasite Kills Self", the Southern Worker newspaper said the following about Kaul's death:

John Lanzel Kaul, capitalist, of Birmingham, Ala., killed himself after a spree at Atlantic City by jumping from a window. Kaul was one of the most vicious labor haters in the South, was always among the worst enemies of any attempt on the part of workers employed in his lumber industry to organize. Kaul was formerly the president of the Birmingham Chapter of the Red Cross, and engaged in other “patriotic” activities that were safe for him. The Birmingham plutes who head lynch mobs will miss their drunken friend.

Whereas radical newspapers slandered him, the Alabama State Commission of Forestry praised him for his "ability, energy and devotion to duty contributed greatly to the advancement of forestry...his public service, and splendid personal qualities were held in highest regard and esteem by the membership of this commission."
