= Nancy Coonsman =

American sculptor

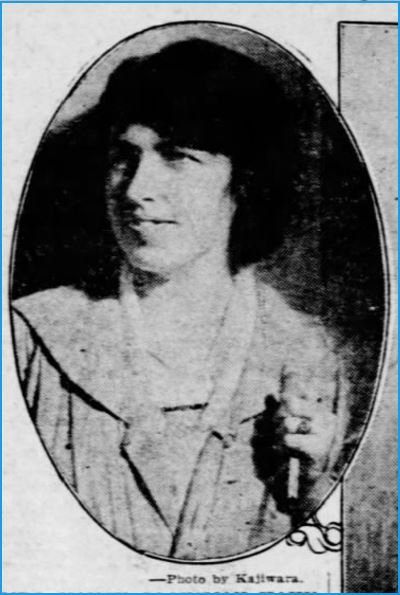
Nancy Coonsman

Nancy Coonsman Hahn (August 28, 1887 – January 27, 1976) was an American sculptor who won the commission for the Missouri War Memorial in Chépy, France.

== Early life ==
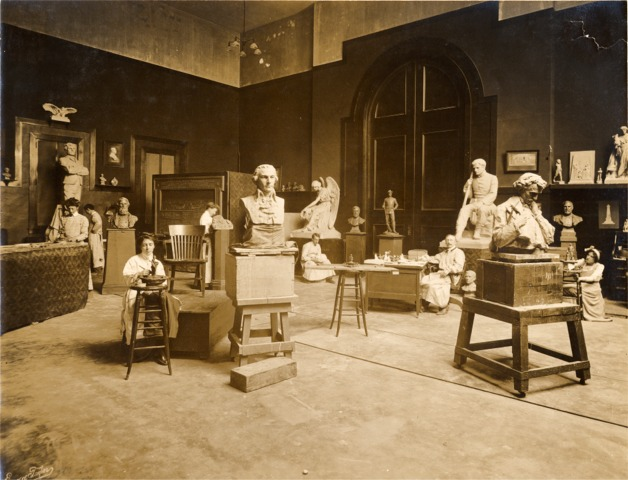
George Julian Zolnay with sculpture students at Art Academy of People's University. Nancy Coonsman is kneeling on the far right.

Nancy Coonsman was born in St. Louis, Missouri, on August 28, 1887, the daughter of Robert A. Coonsman (b. 1851) and Henrietta "Nettie" Hynson (b. 1854).

After passing through the public schools her mother influenced her to develop the talent which she displayed early, and which she herself possessed in a marked degree when young, but had never had the opportunity of developing. Rodney Coonsman, her brother, was interested in the financial sheet of a local newspaper, and his wife was an artist of considerable reputation.

She graduated from the Central High School in 1906. Coonsman took a four-year course in the St. Louis School of Fine Arts of Washington University in St. Louis, in 1911 as an honor student under George Julian Zolnay. This privilege was only accorded to those who showed unusual talent. She then studied in Philadelphia at the Pennsylvania Academy of the Fine Arts with Charles Grafly, then in New York City under Abastenia St. Leger Eberle.

== Career ==
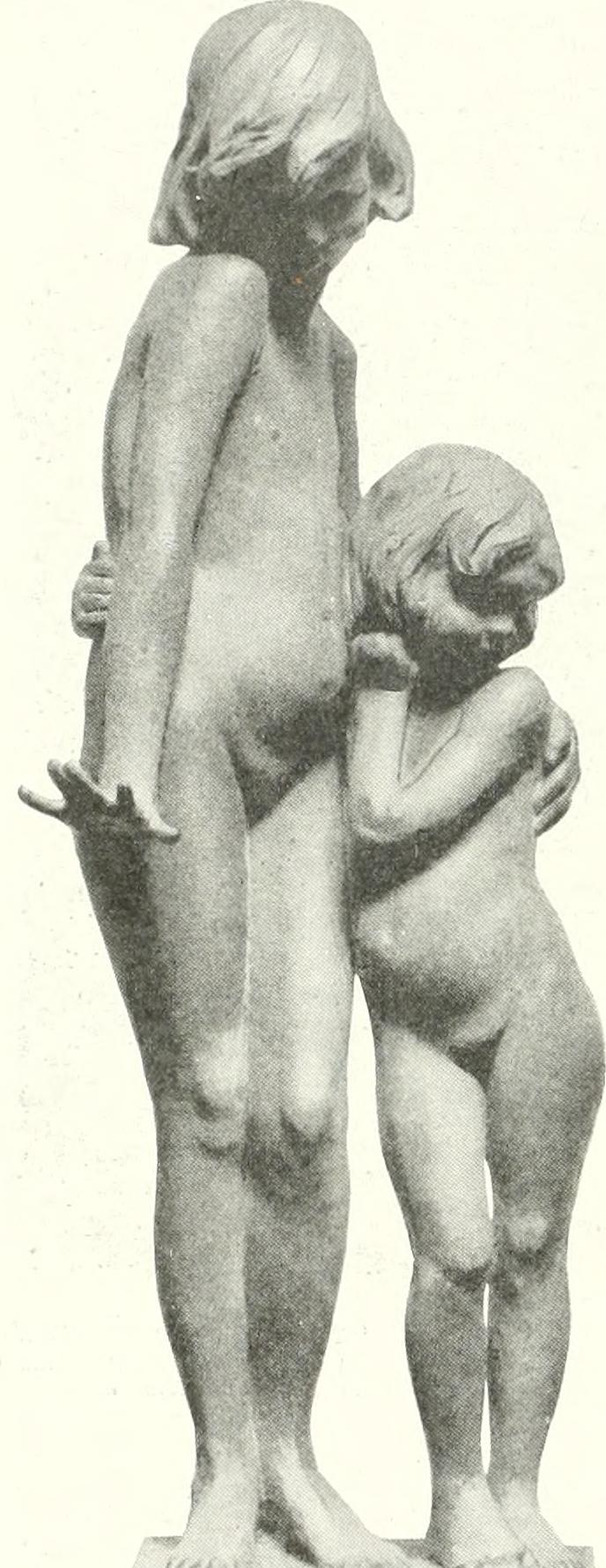
Frogs and Girls, International studio (1897)

Nancy Coonsman exhibited in the Pennsylvania Academy of the Fine Arts, New York Academy of Design and Western Artists' Exhibition.

Fountains, both for interior decorations and the garden, had always held her attention. Coonsman placed a fountain in the Mullanphy Floral Shop, a center fountain with cherubs, and made another of design for Randolph Laughlin's new home, "Lachlin," in St. Louis County. A little St. Louis girl posed for this. There were two figures, and hers was kneeling down on flat stones catching the water in a lily leaf, which she held in her hand, as it trickled through the rock.

Another ambition was to do large agricultural figures in a big conventional way, but in St. Louis the need or call for such work did not come up often.

Coonsman also worked as a teacher, as assistant in the Art School, private classes, and regularly at Bishop Robertson Hall.

Coonsman was selected over a number of competitors to execute sculpture for a fountain for the Kincaid Memorial to be located in the sunken garden behind the Public School Library. Margaret Kincaid of Louisiana, Missouri, had donated funds for a drinking fountain, specifying that the competition had to be open only to women. Coonsman also designed the two concrete benches nearby which are supported by elves.

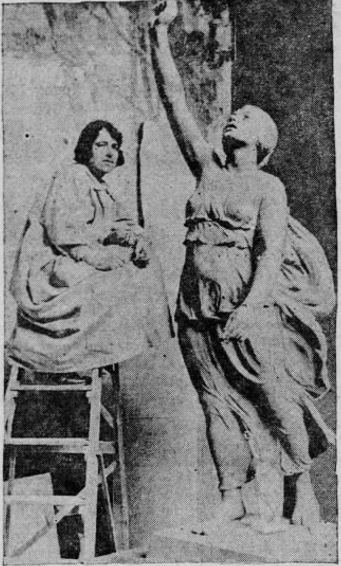
Nancy Coonsman and the Missouri War Memorial

In 1922, Nancy Coonsman won a $25,000 ($348,890.17 in 2017) competition to design the war memorial, called Victory, erected in Cheppy-Varennes-en-Argonne, France, to honor the Missouri soldiers from the 35th Infantry Division (United States) killed during World War I.

In 1926 she designed The Doughboy, dedicated in 1928, to honor World War I soldiers and placed in Overton Park (or Veterans Park) in Memphis, Tennessee.

Later in life she became a teacher and worked on small figures and busts.

== Personal life ==
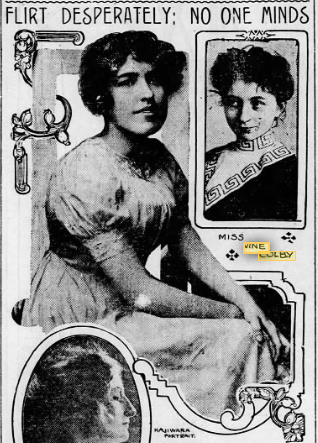
Nancy Coonsman, 1 August 1912, St Louis Post-Dispatch

Nancy Coonsman married Emanual (Mannel) Hahn (b. 1885) in 1918 and they had one son, Charless Hahn (February 13, 1919 – March 17, 1999), a stamp dealer and collector who wrote a column on philately for the Chicago Sun Times.

Hahn was the founder, and consequently first president, of the Burlington Liars' Club. While living in Burlington, Nancy Coonsman sculpted the brass plaque erected by the Burlington Historical Society on Highway 11, west of White River bridge, to commemorate the site of the Voree Mormon settlement.

She died in Winnetka, Illinois, on January 27, 1976.
