= Buttonwood Park Historic District =

Historic district in Massachusetts, United States

- U.S. National Register of Historic Places
- U.S. Historic district
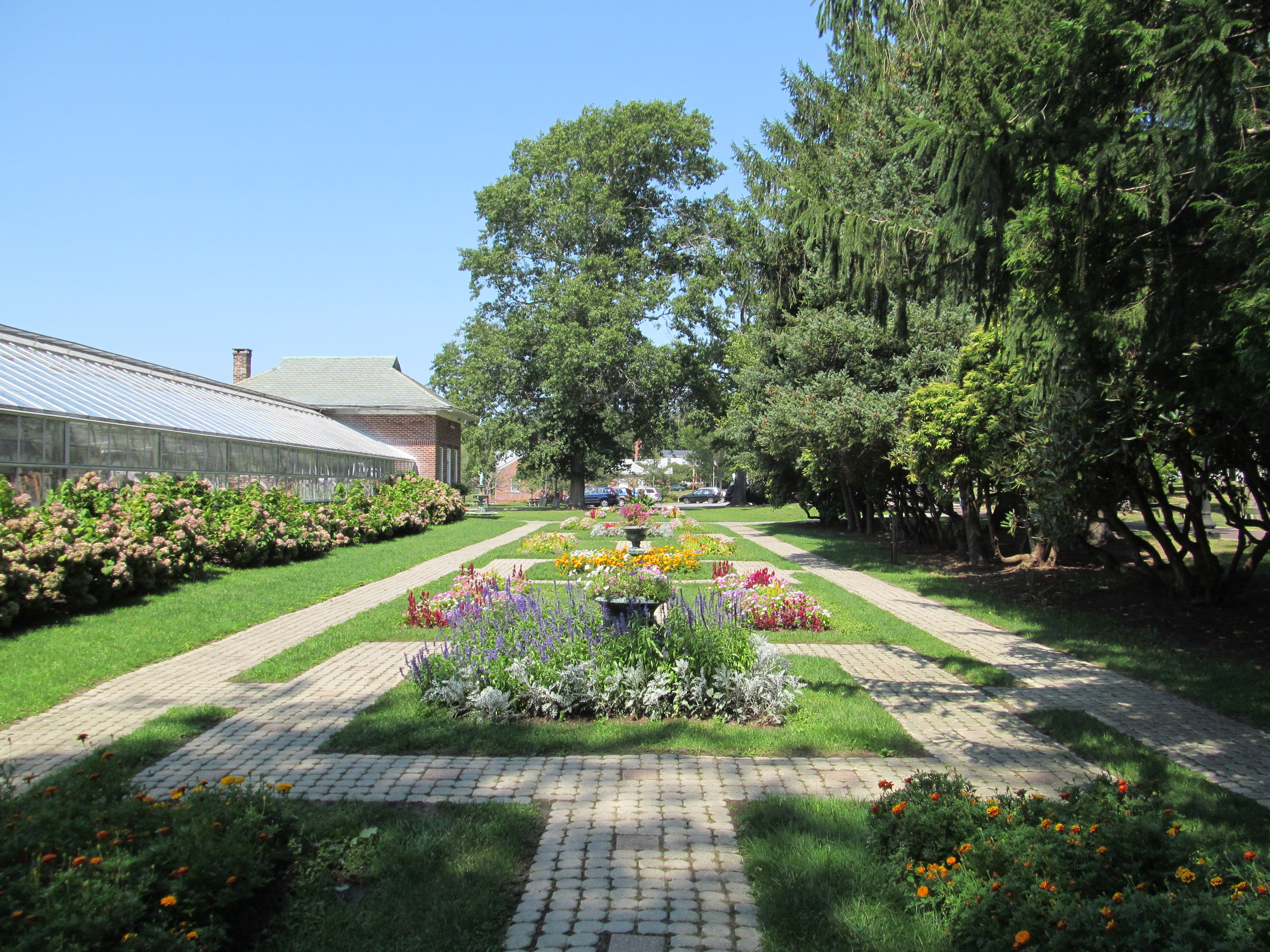
- Formal Garden in Buttonwood Park

- Location within Massachusetts Location within the United States
- Location: Bounded by Kempton St., Rockdale Ave., Hawthorne St., and Brownell Ave., New Bedford, Massachusetts
- Coordinates: 41°37′55″N 70°57′7″W
- Area: 113 acres (46 ha)
- Architect: Charles Eliot
- Architectural style: Colonial Revival, Bungalow/Craftsman
- NRHP reference No.: 00000915
- Added to NRHP: August 24, 2000

Buttonwood Park Historic District is a historic district on Kempton Street, Rockdale Avenue, Hawthorne Street and Brownell Avenue in New Bedford, Massachusetts. Its focal point is Buttonwood Park, a 97-acre (39 ha) municipal park planned by Charles Eliot in the 1890s, and part of its surrounding neighborhood. The neighborhood was developed in the first decades of the 20th century as a complement to the park, and contains a fine selection of Colonial Revival and Craftsman style houses. The district was added to the National Register of Historic Places in 2000.

== Description and history ==
Buttonwood Park is a roughly L-shaped public park located west of downtown New Bedford. The northernmost section of the park is wooded, and is separated from the rest of the park by a 7-acre (2.8 ha) pond. The southern edge of the pond is dammed, and a road, part of the park's circulation, passes east–west across the dam. The southwestern part of the park is occupied by Buttonwood Park Zoo, and the southeastern portion is a combination of an open lawn (for passive recreation) and formal athletic facilities. The park's state represents a partial implementation and subsequent modification to a master plan drafted by Charles Eliot in the 1890s.

The park is bounded by four major local roadways: Brownell Avenue on the west, Kempton Street to the north, Rockdale Avenue to the east, and Hawthorne Street to the south. The northeastern portion of this quadrangle is subdivided into streets of residential housing, and the opposite sides of the bounding streets are also generally lined with housing. These are typically one or two-family wood-frame buildings, built in styles popular in the early 20th century. The most commonly found styles are the Craftsman (particularly in the Bungalow variant) and the Colonial Revival, although there are some clusters of Queen Anne Victorians. Lot sizes are small, and the houses are generally set back similar distances from the street. There is one church, and a few modern commercial intrusions.

== See also ==
- National Register of Historic Places listings in New Bedford, Massachusetts
