= National Register of Historic Places listings in Knox County, Tennessee =

Location of Knox County in Tennessee

This is a list of the National Register of Historic Places listings in Knox County, Tennessee.

This is intended to be a complete list of the properties and districts on the National Register of Historic Places in Knox County, Tennessee, United States. Latitude and longitude coordinates are provided for many National Register properties and districts; these locations may be seen together in a map.

There are 118 properties and districts listed on the National Register in the county, including 1 National Historic Landmark. Another 5 properties were once listed but have been removed.

Contents: Counties in Tennessee
Anderson – Bedford – Benton – Bledsoe – Blount – Bradley – Campbell – Cannon – Carroll – Carter – Cheatham – Chester – Claiborne – Clay – Cocke – Coffee – Crockett – Cumberland – Davidson – Decatur – DeKalb – Dickson – Dyer – Fayette – Fentress – Franklin – Gibson – Giles – Grainger – Greene – Grundy – Hamblen – Hamilton – Hancock – Hardeman – Hardin – Hawkins – Haywood – Henderson – Henry – Hickman – Houston – Humphreys – Jackson – Jefferson – Johnson – Knox – Lake – Lauderdale – Lawrence – Lewis – Lincoln – Loudon – Macon – Madison – Marion – Marshall – Maury – McMinn – McNairy – Meigs – Monroe – Montgomery – Moore – Morgan – Obion – Overton – Perry – Pickett – Polk – Putnam – Rhea – Roane – Robertson – Rutherford – Scott – Sequatchie – Sevier – Shelby – Smith – Stewart – Sullivan – Sumner – Tipton – Trousdale – Unicoi – Union – Van Buren – Warren – Washington – Wayne – Weakley – White – Williamson – Wilson

This National Park Service list is complete through NPS recent listings posted August 21, 2026.

== History ==
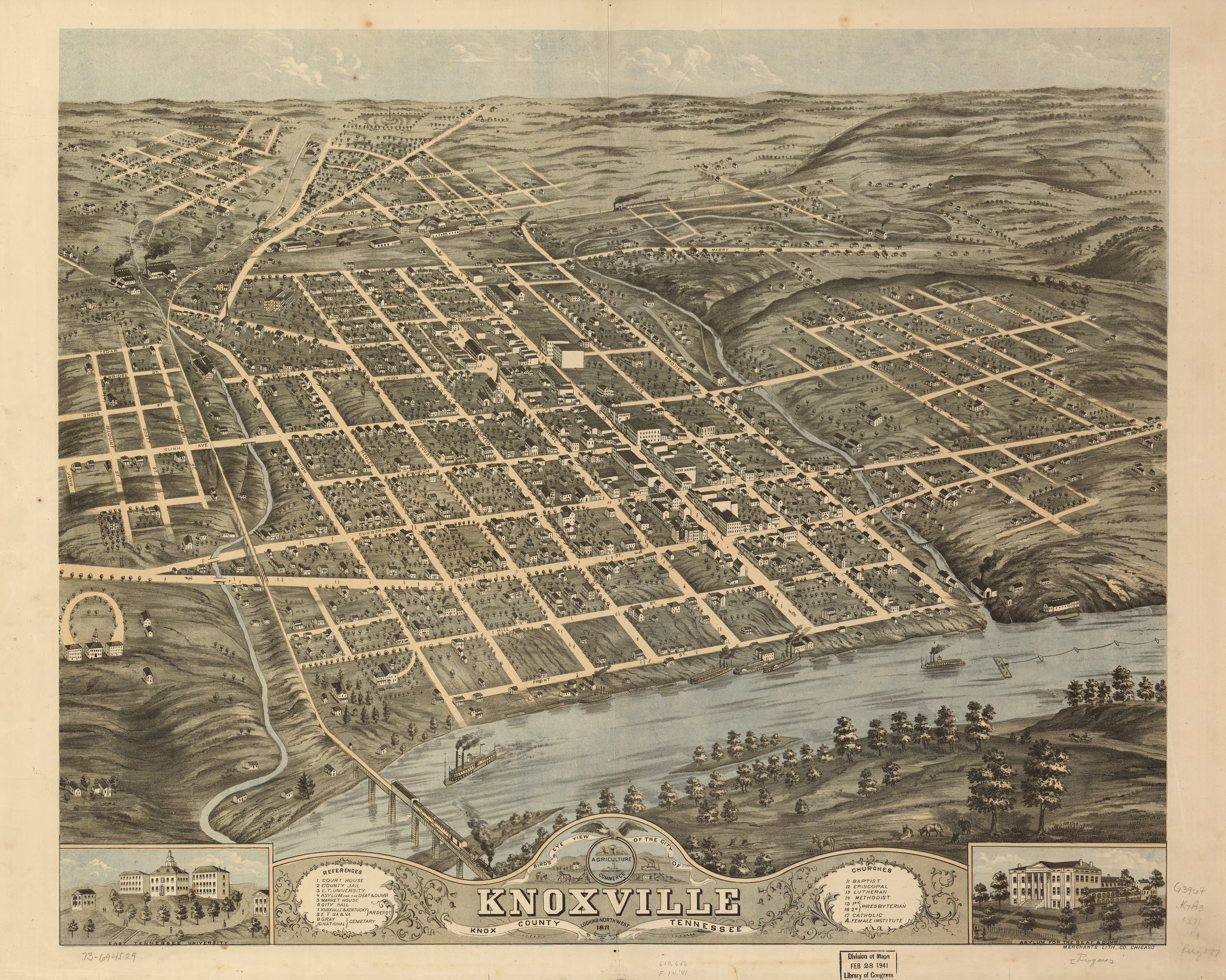
1871 Rendering of Knoxville, looking to the north-northwest

The earliest settlers in what is now Knox County were Native Americans - the Indian mound is the primary "built structure" that remains from their era. Beginning with explorer Hernando de Soto, who traveled near the county, the earliest Europeans were not settlers but explorers and hunters who left no permanent structures. However, when North Carolina made land available in the Land Grab Act of 1783, early settlers began surveying the region. These men included General James White, who soon owned the land that became downtown Knoxville, as well as Frances Alexander Ramsey and Alexander McMillan.

James White settled in rural east Knox County on the French Broad River in 1785, but constructed a cabin in what is now downtown Knoxville in 1786. General White later requested that his son-in-law, Charles McClung, survey the land around his cabin and lay out sixteen blocks with four lots on each block. After setting aside lots for his residence, a cemetery, college and other functions he deemed necessary, the balance of the lots were sold by lottery on October 3, 1791. In 1792, the community began to take shape: 1) Knox County, Tennessee, was split off from Hawkins County, Tennessee; 2) settlers were constructing buildings on lots they received in the lottery; 3) Samuel and Nathan Cowan opened the first store; and 4) the first tavern was opened by John Chisholm. In 1793, a garrison of soldiers was assigned to protect the settlers.

Other than setting aside land for Blount College (now the University of Tennessee), the earliest structures were built to accommodate basic frontier needs. These included the fort, residences, churches, taverns (which also served as inns) and a cemetery.

In terms of growth, development of the county was due both to expansion of the early settlement (a) and the development of roads (b), which linked James White's Fort to other parts of the state: (a) The original 16 square blocks was expanded to accommodate growth in the population. Moses White, James White's son, laid out East Knoxville, which was originally a separate city and called Mechanicsburg. Colonel John Williams laid out the west end of the town, which was briefly known as Williamsburg; and (b) Roads were constructed to allow access both to surrounding settlements in rural areas of Knox County, and to allow pioneers to travel from the east coast further west. Settlers typically traveled down from southwest Virginia through Rogersville, Tennessee on the Knoxville Road before arriving at Knoxville. By 1795, what is now Kingston Pike went from James White's Fort to the western end of the county. Beyond the western end of the county, this route became known as the Nashville Road. By 1807, the Knoxville Gazette reported that 200 settlers a day were passing through the city on their way further west. Further north in Knox County, Adair's Fort, built by John Adair in Fountain City, protected settlers traveling westward on the Emory Road. And by 1792, Alexander Cunningham was operating the first ferry over the Tennessee River south of Knoxville.

Despite ceasing to be Tennessee's state capital in 1817, Knoxville continued to grow slowly through the antebellum period. And due to the mountainous terrain, slavery never took root as deeply in East Tennessee as it did in Middle Tennessee and West Tennessee. The valleys of East Tennessee, such as the area west of Knoxville accessed by Kingston Pike, did have plantations, a few of whose houses still remain. And the Tennessee River was not as navigable at Knoxville as it was further downstream, so, other than the roads, the city remained comparatively isolated until the railroads reached the city in 1855. Then, due to Knoxville's central location in the southeast and the railroads that traversed it, the city experienced explosive growth. Initially, the East Tennessee & Virginia Railroad (which soon became the East Tennessee, Virginia and Georgia Railroad, and later became part of Southern Railway) began operations in the city. The Louisville and Nashville Railroad soon followed, giving Knoxville access to two prominent transportation companies and two rail stations of architectural significance. The 1880s were the greatest growth period in the city's history, although there was substantial growth after World War II.

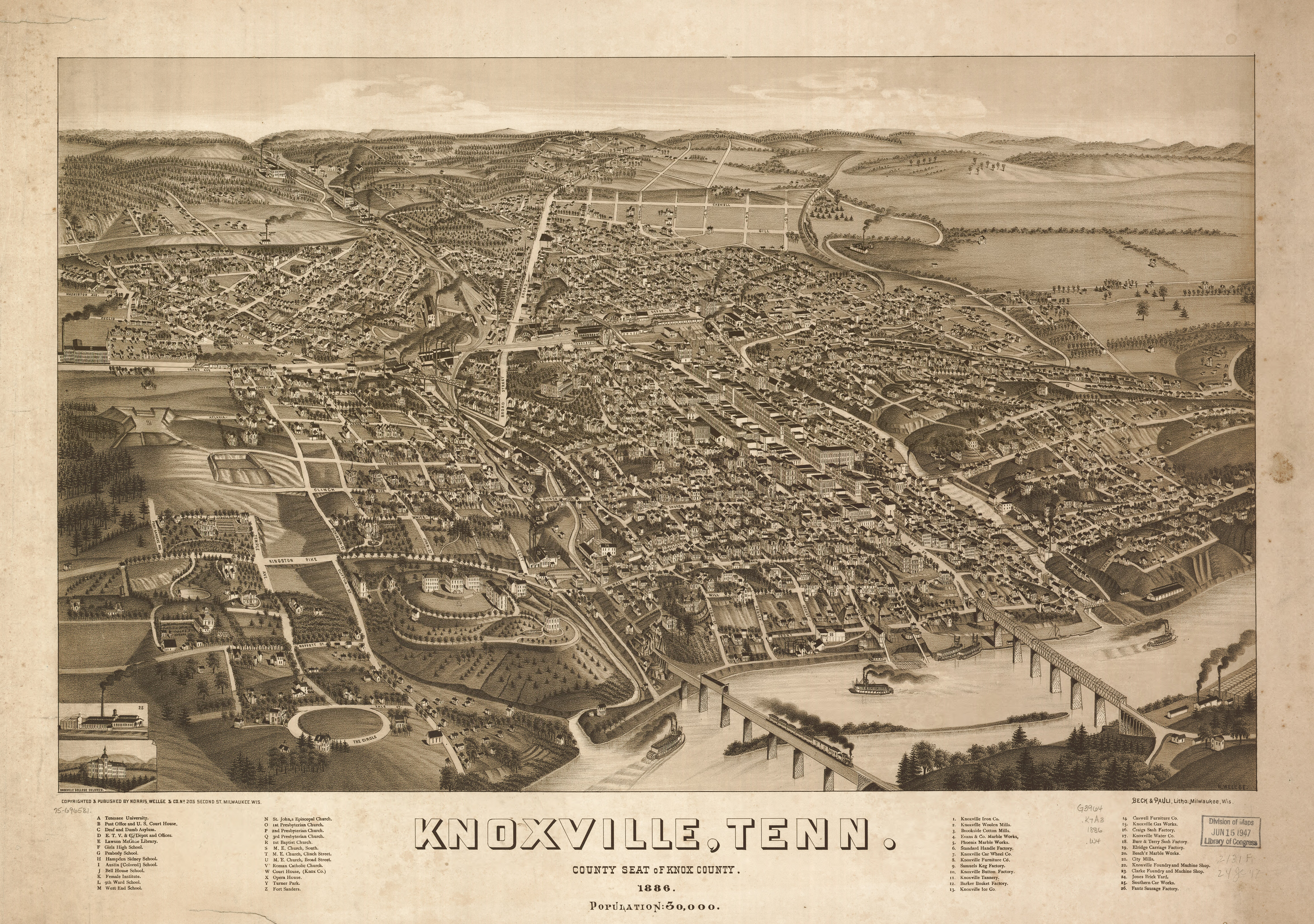
1886 Aerial Rendering of Knoxville

Structures now listed on the National Register of Historic Places largely reflect this expansion. There were isolated pockets of settlement, such as the Ramsey House and Marble Springs, in what remains the rural part of the county. As Kingston Pike developed, Crescent Bend and other estates were constructed in what soon became affluent western Knox County. Kingston Pike also linked Bearden, Ebenezer's Mill, and later linked Farragut, Concord and Kingston to Knoxville. There was a flurry of commercial and residential development in the late 19th century. As electric streetcars began operation, suburban expansion moved both north and south. Automobiles allowed further urban sprawl to develop.

As the county has expanded, many historic structures have been lost to development. Examples include: 18th-century Chisholm Tavern, which was not demolished until the 20th century as part of the construction of James White Parkway; the Mabry Hood House on Kingston Pike, which was demolished to allow construction of Pellissippi Parkway; and the Baker Peters House on Kingston Pike, which has survived, but has been stripped of its context due to surrounding commercial development, including a carwash in its front yard. By 1900, all that remained of James White's Fort was the fort's main house, which itself was dismantled and moved to a farm outside the city in 1906. In the 1960s, preservation groups moved the house to its present location on Hill Avenue, and reconstructed its historic palisades and outbuildings. Because it has been moved from its original location, the fort is not eligible for listing on the National Register.

== Current listings ==
	Name on the Register	Image	Date listed	Location	City or town	Description
1	Adair Gardens Historic District	Adair Gardens Historic District	September 23, 1994 (#94001136)	Roughly bounded by Adair, Rose, and Coile Drs. 36°01′32″N 83°55′32″W	Knoxville	Consists of several houses built in the 1920s and 1930s in the Fountain City community
2	Airplane Service Station	Airplane Service Station	March 18, 2004 (#04000198)	6829 Clinton Highway; 36°00′33″N 84°01′53″W	Powell	Filling station built in 1930 in the shape of an airplane; located just outside Knoxville in the Powell community
3	Asbury Methodist Episcopal Church, South	Asbury Methodist Episcopal Church, South	March 18, 1997 (#97000222)	2820 Asbury Rd. 35°57′13″N 83°49′33″W	Knoxville	Now Asbury United Methodist Church
4	Alexander Bishop House	Alexander Bishop House	September 3, 1997 (#97000953)	7924 Bishop Rd. 36°03′51″N 83°59′35″W	Knoxville	Believed to have been built in the early 1790s
5	Ayres Hall	Ayres Hall	August 1, 2012 (#12000466)	1403 Circle Dr., University of Tennessee; 35°57′27″N 83°55′34″W	Knoxville	Completed 1921; renovated 2008
6	George F. Barber Cottage		April 2, 2025 (#100011618)	1701 E. Glenwood Ave. 35°59′07″N 83°54′33″W	Knoxville	
7	Bethel Confederate Cemetery and Winstead Cottage	Bethel Confederate Cemetery and Winstead Cottage	September 8, 2015 (#15000117)	1917 Bethel Ave. 35°58′28″N 83°54′05″W	Knoxville	Website
8	Bleak House	Bleak House	November 8, 1984 (#84000369)	3148 Kingston Pike; 35°56′58″N 83°57′22″W	Knoxville	Also known as "Confederate Memorial Hall"; currently a museum
9	William Blount Mansion	William Blount Mansion	October 15, 1966 (#66000726)	200 W. Hill Ave. 35°57′40″N 83°54′55″W	Knoxville	
10	Boyd-Harvey House	Boyd-Harvey House	November 7, 1985 (#85002774)	Harvey Rd. 35°50′04″N 84°10′48″W	Knoxville	Located west of Knoxville near Concord
11	Alfred Buffat Homestead	Alfred Buffat Homestead	April 1, 1975 (#75001761)	1 mile (1.6 km) north of Knoxville on Love Creek Road; 36°01′39″N 83°51′48″W	Knoxville	Late-1860s homestead in northeast Knoxville
12	Burwell Building Tennessee Theater	Burwell Building Tennessee Theater	April 1, 1982 (#82003979)	600 S. Gay St. 35°57′44″N 83°55′10″W	Knoxville	Built 1907, theater designed in the Spanish-Moorish style by Graven & Mayger
13	Camp House	Camp House	April 24, 1973 (#73001800)	1306 Broadway, NE. 35°59′03″N 83°55′19″W	Knoxville	Commonly called "Greystone"; completed in 1890 for coal tycoon Eldad Cicero Camp, designed by Alfred B. Mullett; now houses offices for local station WATE-TV
14	Candoro Marble Works	Candoro Marble Works	July 22, 2005 (#96001399)	681 Maryville Pike; 35°55′58″N 83°55′06″W	Knoxville	Marble finishing complex built in 1914; includes showroom and garage designed by architect Charles I. Barber; initially added in 1996, showroom and garage relisted for architectural significance in 2005
15	Central United Methodist Church	Central United Methodist Church	November 9, 2005 (#05001225)	201 E. 3rd Ave. 35°58′42″N 83°55′20″W	Knoxville	Gothic Revival church designed by Baumann & Baumann
16	Chesterfield House	Chesterfield House	November 16, 1977 (#77001276)	North of Mascot off Old Rutledge Pike; 36°05′37″N 83°45′06″W	Mascot	Georgian-style house built in 1838
17	Christenberry Club Room	Christenberry Club Room	March 14, 1997 (#97000242)	Southwestern corner of the junction of Henegar and Shamrock Aves. 35°59′51″N 83°55′46″W	Knoxville	Designed by Knoxville architectural firm Barber & McMurry
18	Church Street Methodist Church	Church Street Methodist Church	March 10, 2009 (#09000115)	913 Henley St. 35°57′36″N 83°55′14″W	Knoxville	Designed by Barber & McMurry and John Russell Pope
19	Concord Village Historic District	Concord Village Historic District	October 22, 1987 (#87001888)	Roughly bounded by Lakeridge and 3rd Drs., Spring St., and the Masonic Hall and Cemetery; 35°51′58″N 84°08′17″W	Concord	
20	Contractor's Supply, Inc.	Contractor's Supply, Inc.	July 13, 2011 (#11000457)	1909 Schofield St. 35°58′18″N 83°57′20″W	Knoxville	Moderne-style structure built by contractor and developer Howard Rodgers in 1947; designed by Shelton & Stachel
21	Cowan, McClung and Company Building	Cowan, McClung and Company Building	July 12, 1984 (#84003566)	500-504 Gay St. 35°57′55″N 83°55′05″W	Knoxville	Now called the "Fidelity Building"; built in 1871, remodeled in 1929 by Baumann & Baumann
22	Craighead-Jackson House	Craighead-Jackson House	March 20, 1973 (#73001801)	1000 State St. 35°57′40″N 83°54′52″W	Knoxville	
23	Daniel House	Daniel House	March 19, 1998 (#98000240)	2701 Woodson Dr. 35°55′23″N 83°56′57″W	Knoxville	Moderne-style house built using the frame of a Quonset hut; designed by James Fitzgibbon
24	Daylight Building	Daylight Building	November 25, 2009 (#09000956)	501-517 Union Ave. 35°56′59″N 83°57′17″W	Knoxville	
25	H.L. Dulin House	H.L. Dulin House	October 15, 1974 (#74002265)	3100 Kingston Pike; 35°56′59″N 83°57′17″W	Knoxville	Also called "Crescent Bluff"; current address is 3106 Kingston Pike
26	Ebenezer Mill	Ebenezer Mill	June 25, 1987 (#87001037)	409 Ebenezer Rd. 35°54′19″N 84°04′25″W	Knoxville	Turbine-powered gristmill in West Knoxville
27	Emory Place Historic District	Emory Place Historic District	November 10, 1994 (#94001259)	Roughly bounded by Broadway, N. Central, Emory, 5th, E. 4th, and King Sts.; also Portions of North Broadway, North Central, Lamar, King, and North Gay Sts., Emory Pl., East 4th, East 5th. and West 5th Aves. 35°58′27″N 83°55′21″W	Knoxville	Includes Knoxville High School, First Christian Church, a fire station, and several commercial and residential structures; boundary increases were approved April 20, 2023 and March 20, 2025.
28	Fire Station No. 5	Fire Station No. 5	November 2, 1978 (#78002602)	419 Arthur St., NW. 35°58′09″N 83°55′56″W	Knoxville	Early-20th century Knoxville Fire Department station built to serve the Mechanicsville neighborhood
29	First Baptist Church	First Baptist Church	March 8, 1997 (#97000223)	510 Main Ave. 35°57′37″N 83°55′07″W	Knoxville	Designed by Dougherty & Gardner
30	First Presbyterian Church Cemetery	First Presbyterian Church Cemetery	December 4, 1996 (#96001400)	Adjacent to 620 State St. 35°57′35″N 83°55′15″W	Knoxville	Knoxville's oldest cemetery
31	Forest Hills Boulevard Historic District	Forest Hills Boulevard Historic District	April 14, 1992 (#92000350)	500-709 Forest Hills Blvd. 35°56′44″N 83°59′09″W	Knoxville	Consists of 20 houses built in the late 1920s and 1930s
32	Fort Sanders Historic District	Fort Sanders Historic District	September 16, 1980 (#80003839)	Roughly bounded by White and Grand Aves. and 11th and 19th Sts. 35°57′37″N 83°55′54″W	Knoxville	Consists of several hundred houses and other buildings constructed c. 1880-1920 in the vicinity of the Civil War-era Fort Sanders
33	Fourth and Gill Historic District	Fourth and Gill Historic District	April 29, 1985 (#85000948)	Roughly bounded by Interstate 40, Broadway, Central and 5th Ave. 35°58′48″N 83°55′14″W	Knoxville	Includes three churches and several dozen houses built c. 1880-1930
34	Gay Street Commercial Historic District	Gay Street Commercial Historic District	November 4, 1986 (#86002912)	Roughly along Gay St. from Summit Hill Dr. to Church Ave. 35°57′56″N 83°55′06″W	Knoxville	Consists of nearly three dozen buildings constructed c. 1880-1940, during Knoxville's commercial boom period
35	General Building	General Building	March 8, 1988 (#88000174)	625 Market St. 35°57′47″N 83°55′07″W	Knoxville	Designed by Barber & McMurry; now home to First Bank
36	Gibbs Drive Historic District	Gibbs Drive Historic District	November 8, 2000 (#00001354)	Gibbs Dr. 36°02′07″N 83°55′35″W	Knoxville	Consists of several early-20th-century houses built along Gibbs Drive in Knoxville's Fountain City community
37	Nicholas Gibbs House	Nicholas Gibbs House	September 9, 1988 (#88001447)	7633 E Emory Rd. 36°07′26″N 83°50′37″W	Corryton	Log house built in 1793 by pioneer Nicholas Gibbs
38	Giffin Grammar School		November 22, 2016 (#16000788)	1834 Beech St. 35°57′14″N 83°53′27″W	Knoxville	
39	Happy Holler Historic District	Happy Holler Historic District	April 23, 2014 (#14000185)	1200-1209, 1211 N, Central St., 103,105 E. Anderson & 109, 115 W. Anderson Aves. 35°58′54″N 83°55′47″W	Knoxville	Part of the Knoxville and Knox County MPS
40	Hilltop		March 22, 2016 (#16000119)	5617 Lyons View Pike; 35°55′50″N 83°59′30″W	Knoxville	NRHP page
41	Holston National Bank	Holston National Bank	October 2, 1979 (#79002446)	531 S. Gay St. 35°57′51″N 83°55′06″W	Knoxville	Designed by John Kevan Peebles. Currently a condominium high-rise known simply as "The Holston".
42	Hopecote	Hopecote	March 20, 2012 (#12000137)	1820 Melrose Ave. 35°57′11″N 83°55′59″W	Knoxville	Designed by local architect John Fanz Staub; includes a cupboard designed by Thomas Hope (whose great-great-grandson built the house), a hearthstone from the James Park House, and woodwork made from timbers salvaged from the Admiral David Farragut birthplace; used as a guesthouse by U.T.
43	Hotpoint Living-Conditioned Home	Hotpoint Living-Conditioned Home	March 15, 2010 (#10000086)	509 W. Hills Rd. 35°56′12″N 84°01′51″W	Knoxville	Demonstration "starter home" built in 1954 in West Hills subdivision; designed by Bruce McCarty
44	Howell Nurseries		July 26, 2022 (#100007965)	2743 Wimpole Ave. 35°59′00″N 83°52′55″W	Knoxville	
45	Island Home Park Historic District	Island Home Park Historic District	November 10, 1994 (#94001260)	Bounded by Island Home Boulevard, Fisher and Spence Places, and Maplewood; 35°57′33″N 83°52′52″W	Knoxville	Includes 119 contributing houses built c. 1899-1940 in the Island Home Park community of South Knoxville
46	Jackson Avenue Warehouse District	Jackson Avenue Warehouse District	April 11, 1973 (#73001802)	Jackson Ave.; also 120-124 Jackson Ave. 35°58′13″N 83°55′08″W	Knoxville	120-124 Jackson represents a boundary increase of March 10, 1975
47	Andrew Johnson Hotel	Andrew Johnson Hotel	July 9, 1980 (#80003840)	912 S. Gay St. 35°57′41″N 83°54′56″W	Knoxville	Now houses offices for Knox County Schools and other county departments; designed by Baumann & Baumann
48	Dr. C.B. Jones House		March 23, 2026 (#100012854)	631 Scenic Drive; 35°56′23″N 83°58′10″W	Knoxville	
49	Leroy Keener House	Leroy Keener House	November 13, 1997 (#97001440)	3506 Woodlawn School Rd. 35°56′51″N 83°43′24″W	Knoxville	Greek Revival-style house in southeast Knox County
50	Kern's Bakery	Kern's Bakery	May 8, 2017 (#100000979)	2110 Chapman Hwy. 35°57′11″N 83°54′55″W	Knoxville	
51	Kingston Pike Historic District	Kingston Pike Historic District	December 4, 1996 (#96001404)	Roughly 2728-3151, 3201, 3219, 3401, 3425, and 3643 Kingston Pike; 35°56′58″N 83°57′18″W	Knoxville	Includes Crescent Bend, the H.L. Dulin House, Judge Taylor House, and several others
52	Knollwood	Knollwood	May 12, 1975 (#75001762)	6411 Kingston Pike; 35°56′02″N 84°00′32″W	Knoxville	Currently home to Schaad Companies; address sometimes listed as 150 Major Reynolds Place
53	Knox County Courthouse	Knox County Courthouse	April 24, 1973 (#73001803)	Main Ave. and Gay St. 35°57′39″N 83°55′01″W	Knoxville	Built by Stephenson and Getaz
54	Knoxville Business College	Knoxville Business College	January 27, 1983 (#83003042)	209 W. Church St. 35°57′50″N 83°55′01″W	Knoxville	Commonly called the "Keyhole Building"; now houses condominiums
55	Knoxville College Historic District	Knoxville College Historic District	May 1, 1980 (#80003841)	901 College St., NW. 35°58′11″N 83°56′34″W	Knoxville	
56	Knoxville Iron Foundry Complex-Nail Factory and Warehouse	Knoxville Iron Foundry Complex-Nail Factory and Warehouse	March 25, 1982 (#82003980)	715 Western Ave., NW. 35°57′55″N 83°55′36″W	Knoxville	Built by the Knoxville Iron Company in 1875 as a nail factory; now an event center known as "The Foundry"
57	Knoxville National Cemetery	Knoxville National Cemetery	September 12, 1996 (#96000966)	939 Tyson St., NW. 35°58′32″N 83°55′39″W	Knoxville	
58	Knoxville Post Office	Knoxville Post Office	May 31, 1984 (#84003567)	501 Main St. 35°57′39″N 83°55′08″W	Knoxville	Designed by Baumann & Baumann
59	Knoxville YMCA Building	Knoxville YMCA Building	November 17, 1983 (#83004256)	605 Clinch Ave. 35°57′47″N 83°55′16″W	Knoxville	Designed by Barber & McMurry
60	Lamar House Hotel	Lamar House Hotel	December 4, 1975 (#75001763)	803 Gay St., SW. 35°57′47″N 83°55′03″W	Knoxville	Lamar House Hotel built in 1816, Bijou Theater (its current function) added in 1909
61	Charles L. Lawhon Cottage	Charles L. Lawhon Cottage	November 27, 2019 (#100004685)	1910 Prospect Place; 35°58′09″N 83°53′43″W	Knoxville	
62	Lebanon in the Forks Cemetery	Lebanon in the Forks Cemetery	November 29, 2010 (#10000934)	Asbury Rd. north of Norfolk Southern Railroad; 35°57′37″N 83°50′50″W	Knoxville	Contains Knox County's oldest marked burial.
63	Lincoln Park United Methodist Church	Lincoln Park United Methodist Church	July 14, 2005 (#05000695)	3120 Pershing St. 36°00′03″N 83°56′12″W	Knoxville	
64	Lindbergh Forest Historic District	Lindbergh Forest Historic District	February 10, 1998 (#94001261)	Along Chamberlain, Druid, Glenhurst, Southwood, Winslow, and Woodlawn; 35°56′35″N 83°54′27″W	Knoxville	Early automobile suburb, developed in the late-1920s and 1930s
65	Louisville and Nashville Freight Depot	Louisville and Nashville Freight Depot	March 25, 1982 (#82003981)	700 Western Ave., NW. 35°57′51″N 83°55′31″W	Knoxville	Built 1903-1904
66	Louisville and Nashville Passenger Station	Louisville and Nashville Passenger Station	March 25, 1982 (#82003982)	700 Western Ave., NW. 35°57′51″N 83°55′28″W	Knoxville	Built 1904-1905, currently home to the Knox County STEM Academy; designed by Richard Monfort
67	Joseph Alexander Mabry, Jr. House	Joseph Alexander Mabry, Jr. House	November 13, 1989 (#89001974)	1711 Dandridge Ave. 35°58′16″N 83°54′11″W	Knoxville	Built in 1858. Commonly called the Mabry-Hazen House; now a museum
68	Mall Building	Mall Building	August 26, 1982 (#82003983)	1, 3, 5 Market St. 35°57′53″N 83°55′11″W	Knoxville	Also called the Kern Building, Odd Fellows Hall, or Hotel St. Oliver; designed by Joseph Baumann, and built in 1875 for confectioner Peter Kern
69	Marble Springs	Marble Springs	May 6, 1971 (#71000823)	South of Knoxville on Neubert Springs Rd. 35°53′46″N 83°52′20″W	Knoxville	
70	Market Square Commercial Historic District	Market Square Commercial Historic District	December 20, 1984 (#84001138)	Market Sq. Mall; 35°57′54″N 83°55′10″W	Knoxville	Contains 20 contributing buildings constructed c. 1870-1925
71	Maxwell-Kirby House		November 30, 1999 (#99001446)	8671 Northshore Dr. 35°53′08″N 84°02′23″W	Knoxville	
72	Samuel McCammon House	Samuel McCammon House	March 1, 1984 (#84003571)	1715 Riverside Dr. 35°57′55″N 83°53′51″W	Knoxville	Currently houses offices of Engert Plumbing & Heating, Inc.
73	Alexander McMillan House	Alexander McMillan House	May 10, 2001 (#01000504)	7703 Strawberry Plains Pike; 36°00′41″N 83°45′57″W	Knoxville	Constructed c. 1785 by early Knox County pioneer Alexander McMillan (1749-1837)
74	Mead Marble Quarry	Mead Marble Quarry	March 26, 2014 (#14000085)	2915 Island Home Ave. 35°57′05″N 83°52′14″W	Knoxville	Tennessee marble quarry and lime plant complex
75	Mechanics' Bank and Trust Company Building	Mechanics' Bank and Trust Company Building	January 27, 1983 (#83003043)	612 S. Gay St. 35°57′53″N 83°55′04″W	Knoxville	
76	Mechanicsville Historic District	Mechanicsville Historic District	July 18, 1980 (#80003842)	Off State Route 62; 35°58′07″N 83°56′02″W	Knoxville	Consists of several dozen houses and other buildings constructed in the late 19th and early 20th centuries
77	Medical Arts Building	Medical Arts Building	May 24, 1984 (#84003573)	603 Main St. 35°57′39″N 83°55′11″W	Knoxville	Built 1929-1930 as an office building for physicians; designed by Manley and Young
78	Middlebrook	Middlebrook	June 18, 1974 (#74001920)	4001 Middlebrook Pike; 35°57′50″N 83°58′39″W	Knoxville	1845-era frame house
79	Minvilla	Minvilla	December 10, 2010 (#10001046)	447 N. Broadway; 35°58′20″N 83°55′28″W	Knoxville	Built as a rowhouse complex in 1913; converted into Fifth Avenue Motel in the early 1960s; rehabilitated as housing for the homeless, 2002-2010; designed by Baumann Brothers
80	Monday House	Monday House	April 19, 2001 (#01000394)	2721 Asbury Rd. 35°57′10″N 83°49′46″W	Knoxville	Also called the Weigel-Shell House
81	Benjamin Morton House	Benjamin Morton House	November 10, 2004 (#04001233)	4084 Kingston Pike; 35°56′39″N 83°58′26″W	Knoxville	Built in 1927 for Knoxville mayor Benjamin Morton, designed by Baumann & Baumann
82	Murphy Springs Farm	Murphy Springs Farm	July 14, 2015 (#14001034)	4508 Murphy Rd. 36°03′17″N 83°52′29″W	Knoxville	
83	New Salem United Methodist Church	New Salem United Methodist Church	August 11, 1983 (#83003044)	2417 Tipton Station Rd. 35°53′06″N 83°53′54″W	Knoxville	Gothic Revival-style church located off Gov. John Sevier Highway in South Knox County
84	Capt. James Newman House		October 30, 1998 (#98001304)	8906 Newman Ln. 35°57′14″N 83°41′59″W	Knoxville	gate across road
85	North Hills Historic District	North Hills Historic District	July 25, 2008 (#08000677)	Roughly bounded by North Hills, North Park, and Fountain Park Boulevards; 36°00′18″N 83°54′06″W	Knoxville	Consists of several dozen houses built in the late 1920s and 1930s
86	Old Gray Cemetery	Old Gray Cemetery	December 4, 1996 (#96001402)	543 N. Broadway; 35°58′29″N 83°55′35″W	Knoxville	
87	Old Knoxville City Hall	Old Knoxville City Hall	May 31, 1972 (#72001241)	Summit Hill Dr. 35°57′55″N 83°55′24″W	Knoxville	Originally the Deaf and Dumb Asylum, used as city hall 1923-1980; now an extension of Lincoln Memorial University; built and possibly designed by Jacob Newman
88	Old North Knoxville Historic District	Old North Knoxville Historic District	May 14, 1992 (#92000506)	Roughly bounded by E. Woodland, Bluff, Armstrong, E. Baxter, and Central Aves. 35°59′13″N 83°55′33″W	Knoxville	Consists of 496 houses and outbuildings constructed c. 1888-1940
89	Old Post Office Building	Old Post Office Building	March 20, 1973 (#73001804)	Clinch and Market Sts. 35°57′49″N 83°55′07″W	Knoxville	Usually called the "Old Customs House"; designed by Alfred B. Mullett; currently houses part of the East Tennessee History Center
90	Ossoli Circle Clubhouse	Ossoli Circle Clubhouse	March 21, 1985 (#85000620)	2511 W. Cumberland Ave. 35°57′10″N 83°56′37″W	Knoxville	Designed by Barber & McMurry
91	Park City Historic District	Park City Historic District	October 25, 1990 (#90001578)	Roughly bounded by Washington Ave., Cherry St., Woodbine Ave., Beaman St., Magnolia Ave., and Winona St. 35°59′13″N 83°53′56″W	Knoxville	Consists of several hundred houses built in the late 19th and early 20th centuries in what is now the Parkridge community and its vicinity
92	Park City Junior High School	Park City Junior High School	June 30, 1983 (#83003045)	523 Bertrand St. 35°58′52″N 83°54′27″W	Knoxville	Designed by Albert Baumann, Jr., and William B. Ittner; renovated as a condominium by Kristopher Kendrick
93	James Park House	James Park House	October 18, 1972 (#72001242)	422 W. Cumberland Ave. 35°57′42″N 83°55′07″W	Knoxville	Rests on foundation built in 1790s by John Sevier, house constructed in 1812 by James Park; now corporate headquarters for Gulf and Ohio Railways
94	Peters House	Peters House	March 31, 1999 (#99000364)	1319 Grainger Ave. 35°59′20″N 83°55′10″W	Knoxville	Built in the 1850s, remodeled in the 1890s by George Franklin Barber
95	Ivan Racheff House	Ivan Racheff House	July 17, 2002 (#02000810)	1943 Tennessee Ave. 35°58′46″N 83°57′12″W	Knoxville	Home and gardens of Knoxville Iron Company president Ivan Racheff; now a museum
96	Ramsey House	Ramsey House	December 23, 1969 (#69000180)	Southeast of Knoxville on Thorngrove Pike; 35°58′02″N 83°49′33″W	Knoxville	Now a museum; built by early Knoxville architect Thomas Hope
97	Riverdale Historic District	Riverdale Historic District	April 23, 1997 (#94001258)	6145 and 6603 Thorngrove Pike and 6802 Hodges Ferry Rd. 35°57′32″N 83°46′27″W	Knoxville	Contains several 19th-century houses related to the Riverdale community
98	Riverdale Mill	Riverdale Mill	March 13, 1987 (#87000464)	Wayland Rd. and Thorngrove Pike; 35°57′32″N 83°46′37″W	Knoxville	19th-century gristmill; overshot wheel still intact
99	Riverdale School	Riverdale School	March 14, 1997 (#97000243)	7009 Thorngrove Pike; 35°57′57″N 83°45′11″W	Knoxville	Built in 1938; designed by Barber & McMurry
100	Ross Marble Quarry	Ross Marble Quarry	March 26, 2014 (#14000086)	2915 Island Home Ave. 35°56′53″N 83°52′18″W	Knoxville	Tennessee marble quarry
101	Avery Russell House	Avery Russell House	June 5, 1975 (#75001759)	11409 Kingston Pike; 35°52′51″N 84°09′41″W	Farragut	Also known as the Martin-Russell House after its initial owner, Samuel Martin
102	St. John's Lutheran Church	St. John's Lutheran Church	April 4, 1985 (#85000700)	544 Broadway, NW. 35°58′26″N 83°55′26″W	Knoxville	Designed by R. F. Graf
103	Savage House and Garden	Savage House and Garden	October 17, 1997 (#97001230)	3237 Garden Dr. 36°02′31″N 83°55′38″W	Knoxville	Japanese-style garden established c. 1915 in Knoxville's Fountain City community
104	Seven Islands Methodist Church	Seven Islands Methodist Church	March 18, 1997 (#97000244)	8100 Seven Islands Rd. 35°57′05″N 83°42′19″W	Knoxville	Located in southeast Knox County near the Sevier County line; congregation founded in 1802, church built in the 1850s
105	South Market Historic District	South Market Historic District	December 4, 1996 (#96001403)	707, 709, and 713 Market St. and 404 and 406 Church Ave. 35°57′47″N 83°54′27″W	Knoxville	Includes the Cherokee Building (404 Church), the Ely (406 Church), the Cunningham (707 Market), the Stuart (709 Market), and the Cate (713 Market), all constructed c. 1895-1907
106	Southern Terminal and Warehouse Historic District	Southern Terminal and Warehouse Historic District	November 18, 1985 (#85002909)	Roughly bounded by Depot Ave., N. Central Ave., Sullivan St., S. Central Ave., Vine Ave., and N. and S. Gay St.; also 100 N. Broadway and 525 W. Jackson Ave. 35°58′10″N 83°55′12″W	Knoxville	Part of this district overlaps with the Jackson Avenue Warehouse Historic District. Second set of addresses represents a boundary increase of March 10, 2004
107	Statesview	Statesview	April 24, 1973 (#73001805)	600 S Peters Rd, about 10 miles (16 km) southwest of Knoxville off U.S. Route 70; 35°53′53″N 84°04′22″W	Knoxville	Built by early Knoxville architect Thomas Hope for surveyor Charles McClung
108	Stratford	Stratford	July 16, 2009 (#09000536)	809 Dry Gap Pike; 36°01′40″N 83°58′24″W	Knoxville	Built in 1910 by furniture magnate James G. Sterchi, designed by R.F. Graf; now an event center
109	Talahi Improvements	Talahi Improvements	December 26, 1979 (#79002447)	near the intersection of Cherokee Blvd and Talahi Dr; 35°56′09″N 83°57′37″W	Knoxville	Late-1920s suburban development in the Sequoyah Hills neighborhood
110	Tennessee School for the Deaf Historic District	Tennessee School for the Deaf Historic District	December 4, 1996 (#96001401)	2725 Island Home Boulevard; 35°57′33″N 83°52′46″W	Knoxville	
111	Trinity Methodist Episcopal Church	Trinity Methodist Episcopal Church	August 26, 1982 (#82003984)	416 Lovenia Ave. 35°58′41″N 83°55′18″W	Knoxville	Now called the "Knoxville House of Faith"; home to a Pentecostal congregation
112	Gen. Lawrence D. Tyson House	Gen. Lawrence D. Tyson House	August 1, 2012 (#12000467)	1609 Melrose Ave., University of Tennessee; 35°57′21″N 83°55′49″W	Knoxville	Home of General Lawrence Tyson; built in 1890s, remodeled in 1907 by George Franklin Barber; now known as the Tyson Alumni House
113	Tyson Junior High School	Tyson Junior High School	July 1, 1998 (#98000821)	2607 Kingston Pike; 35°57′08″N 83°56′45″W	Knoxville	Designed by Baumann & Baumann; now an office building
114	U.T. Agriculture Farm Mound	U.T. Agriculture Farm Mound	March 30, 1978 (#78002603)	Junction of Chapman and Joe Johnson Drives on the University of Tennessee campus 35°56′50″N 83°56′24″W	Knoxville	Late Woodland period mound built c. AD 1000.
115	Westmoreland Water Wheel and Gatepost	Westmoreland Water Wheel and Gatepost	December 18, 2013 (#13000949)	Jct. of Sherwood Dr. & Westland Ave. 35°55′20″N 83°59′57″W	Knoxville	Part of the Knoxville and Knox County MPS; built in 1923 and designed by Charles I. Barber.
116	Westwood	Westwood	November 8, 1984 (#84000366)	3425 Kingston Pike; 35°56′55″N 83°56′58″W	Knoxville	Also known as the Adelia Armstrong Lutz House; designed by Baumann Brothers
117	Gen. John T. Wilder House	Gen. John T. Wilder House	November 24, 1997 (#97001463)	2027 Riverside Dr. 35°57′59″N 83°53′23″W	Knoxville	Built in 1904 by General John T. Wilder
118	Col. John Williams House	Col. John Williams House	December 3, 1980 (#80003843)	2325 Dandridge Ave. 35°58′17″N 83°53′08″W	Knoxville	Home of senator and diplomat John Williams

== Former listings ==
	Name on the Register	Image	Date listed	Date removed	Location	City or town	Description
1	Caswell-Taylor House	Caswell-Taylor House	November 10, 1983 (#83004253)	August 1, 1986	803 N. Fourth St.	Knoxville	Damaged by fire; demolished; former home of Governor Robert Love Taylor
2	Commerce Avenue Fire Hall	Commerce Avenue Fire Hall	August 16, 1977 (#77001275)	August 31, 1977	201-205 Commerce Ave. 35°58′04″N 83°55′06″W	Knoxville	HABS TN-211 ; demolished
3	Lebanon-in-the-Fork Presbyterian Church		May 27, 1975 (#75001764)	February 18, 1983	Asbury Rd.	Knoxville	The church was the first Presbyterian church in Knox County, established in 1791 by Rev. Samuel Carrick. Its building was destroyed in a 1981 fire. The associated cemetery was relisted in 2010.
4	Thomas J. Walker House		April 1, 1998 (#98000279)	July 24, 2008	645 Mars Hill Road	Knoxville	Burned down in 2003
5	Isaac Ziegler House	Isaac Ziegler House	May 2, 1975 (#75001765)	August 1, 1986	712 N. Fourth Ave. 35°58′43″N 83°55′04″W	Knoxville	Demolished.

== See also ==
- History of Knoxville, Tennessee
- List of National Historic Landmarks in Tennessee
- National Register of Historic Places listings in Tennessee
