= Forest Heights, Knoxville =

Historic house in Tennessee, United States

- Forest Hills Boulevard Historic District
- U.S. National Register of Historic Places
- U.S. Historic district
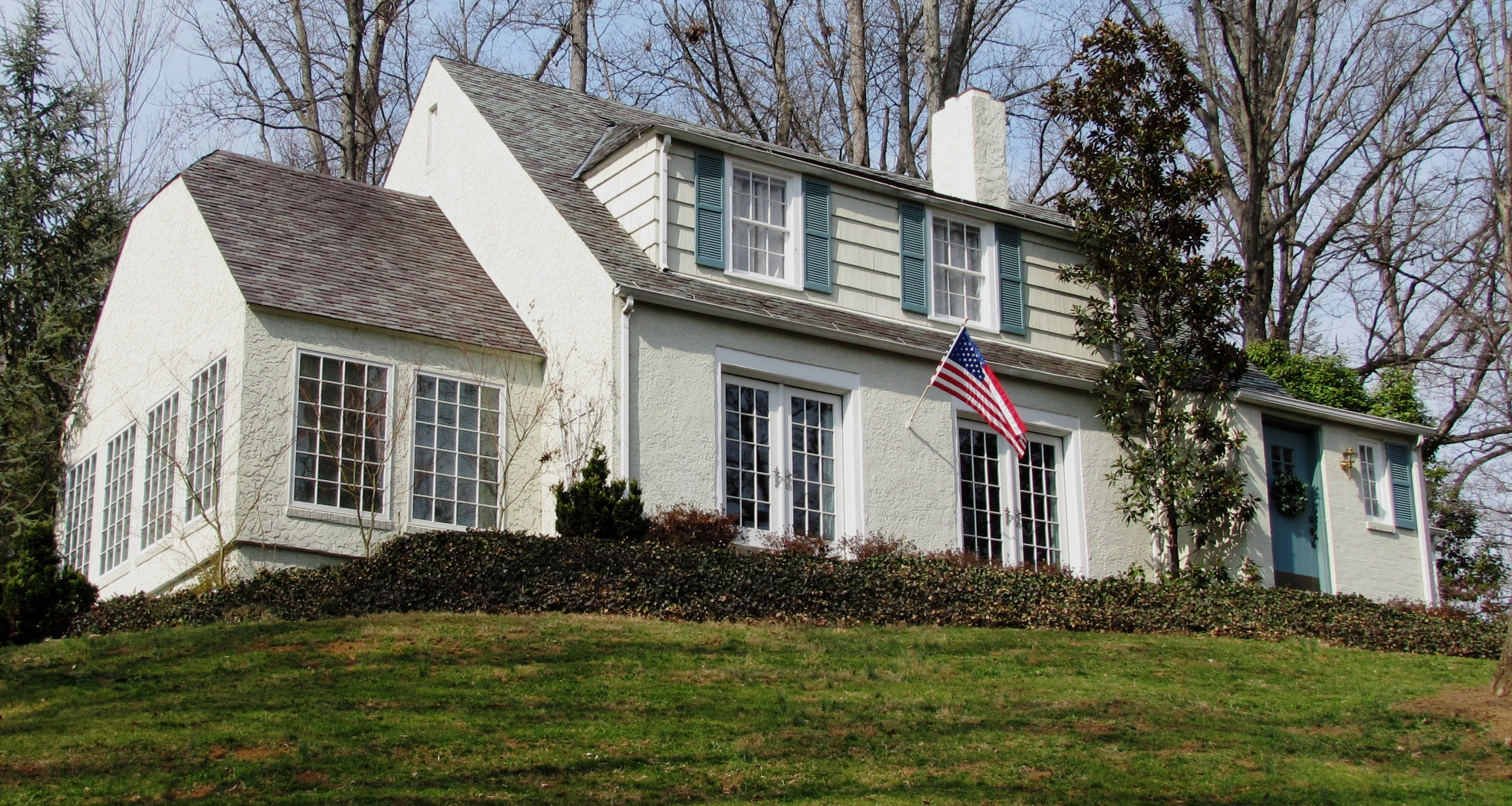

- Location within Tennessee Location within the United States
- Location: Forest Hills Boulevard; Knoxville, Tennessee
- Coordinates: 35°56′44″N 83°59′09″W
- Built: 1928–1938
- Architect: multiple
- Architectural style: Tudor Revival, Colonial Revival, Dutch Colonial Revival, French Eclectic
- NRHP reference No.: 92000350
- Added to NRHP: April 14, 1992

Forest Heights is a neighborhood in Knoxville, Tennessee. It is located in West Knoxville, surrounded by the concurrent Interstates 40 and 75 to the north, Highland Memorial Cemetery to the west, and Sutherland Avenue to the south. The oldest parts of the neighborhood along Forest Hills Boulevard have been listed on the National Register of Historic Places as the Forest Hills Boulevard Historic District.

The neighborhood was initially constructed in the 1920s and 1930s, though most of the current houses date to after World War II. Much like Knoxville neighborhoods such as Sequoyah Hills, North Hills, and Lindbergh Forest, the early development of Forest Heights was influenced by the rise of automobile travel. The neighborhood was annexed by the city of Knoxville in 1960. Interstates 40 and 75 bisected the community much to the protestation of the neighborhood residents.

Its ZIP Code is 37919.
