= Lindbergh Forest =

Historic house in Tennessee, United States

- Lindbergh Forest Historic District
- U.S. National Register of Historic Places
- U.S. Historic district
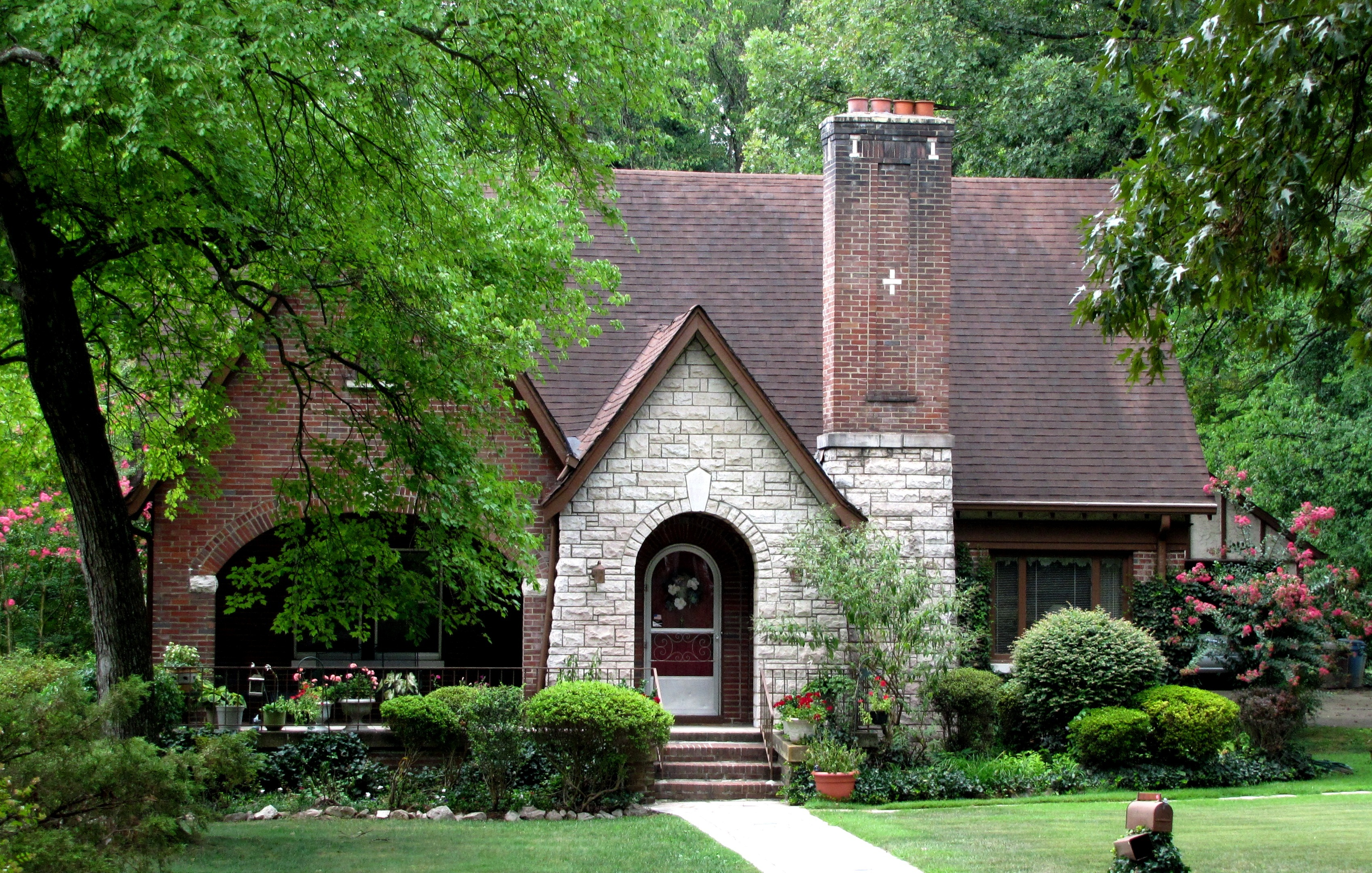
- Tudor Revival-style house at 3419 Southwood Drive, built c. 1929

- Location within Tennessee Location within the United States
- Location: Along Chamberlain, Druid, Glenhurst, Southwood, Winslow, and Woodlawn; Knoxville, Tennessee
- Coordinates: 35°56′35.45″N 83°54′26.73″W
- Area: approximately 25 acres (10 ha)
- Built: 1929–1947
- Architectural style: Tudor Revival, Colonial Revival, Spanish Revival, Lustron
- NRHP reference No.: 94001261
- Added to NRHP: February 10, 1998

Lindbergh Forest is a neighborhood in Knoxville, Tennessee, United States, located off Chapman Highway (US-441) in South Knoxville, that is listed on the National Register of Historic Places as an historic district. Initially developed in the late 1920s as one of Knoxville's first automobile suburbs, the neighborhood is now noted for its late-1920s and early-1930s residential architecture, and the use of East Tennessee marble detailing. The neighborhood also contains two of Knoxville's five surviving Lustron houses. In 1998, several of its houses were added to the National Register of Historic Places as the Lindbergh Forest Historic District.

== Location ==
Traditionally, Lindbergh Forest was situated in an area roughly bounded by Chapman Highway on the west, Woodlawn Pike on the north and east, and Moody Avenue on the south. Today, the Lindbergh Forest Neighborhood has expanded from its original 25 acres to include almost one square mile. Current boundaries, as set by the Lindbergh Forest Neighborhood Association in 2015, are Chapman Highway to the west, East Moody Avenue to the east, and Lippencott Street and Davenport Road to the north. It consists of about 200 single family homes, four apartment complexes, Dogwood Elementary School, Sarah Simpson Professional Development Technology Center, around 18 different businesses, Graystone Presbyterian Church, and the Cecil Webb Recreation Center. A trailhead located behind Dogwood Elementary School links the Lindbergh Forest neighborhood to Knoxville's Urban Wilderness.

The Lindbergh Forest neighborhood is heavily wooded, with numerous mature trees, and contains streets which follow the natural topography. This setting provides a stark contrast with the busy sprawl along adjacent areas of Chapman Highway.

== History ==
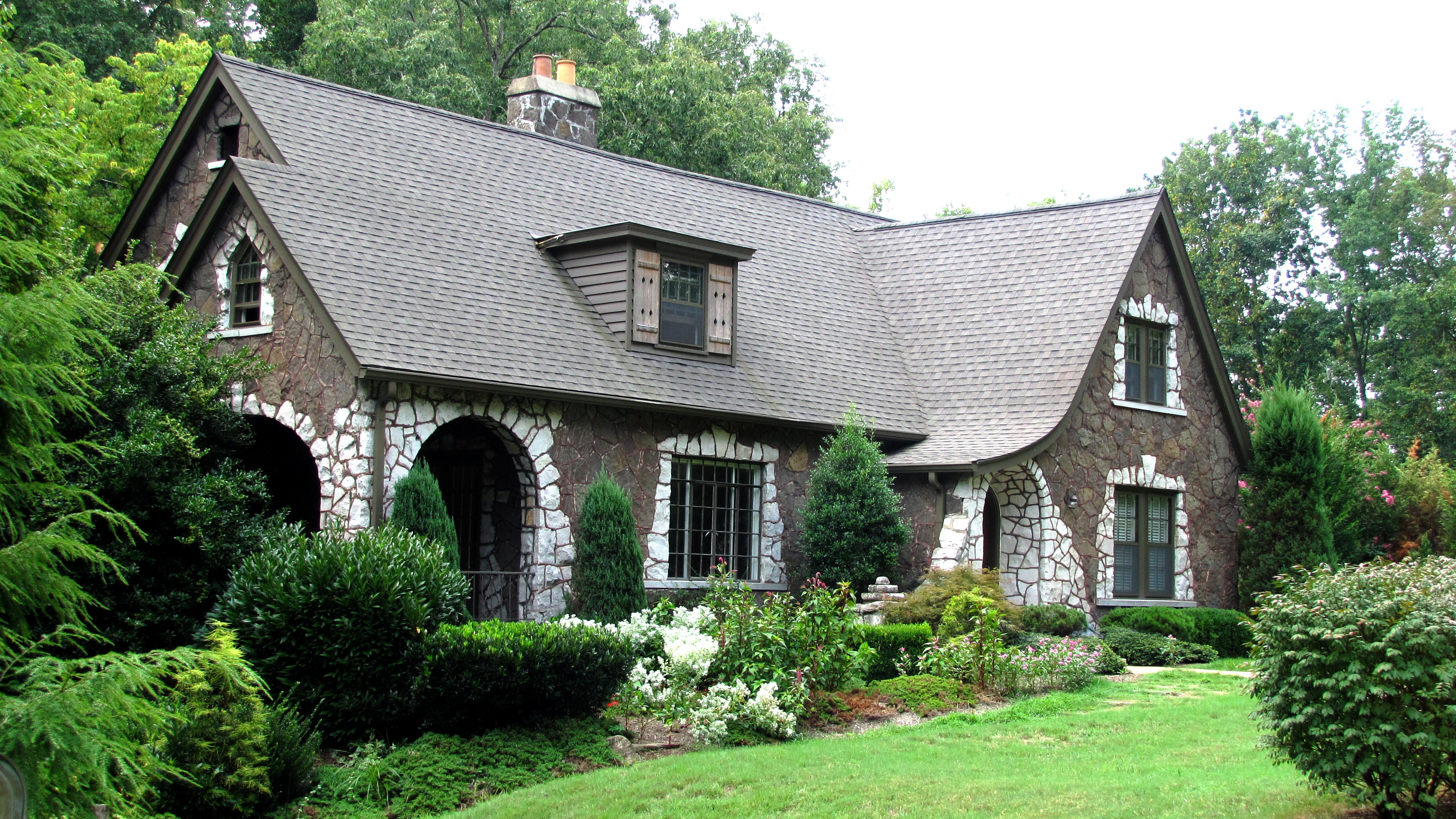
House at 214 Druid Drive, with East Tennessee marble trim

In the late 1920s, real estate developer Victor McClain purchased what is now the Lindbergh Forest area from Samuel B. Luttrell (son of former Knoxville mayor James C. Luttrell). McClain, who had made a fortune developing subdivisions in Florida, hoped to develop a neighborhood catering to Knoxville's rising number of automobile commuters during this period. While similar "automobile suburbs" were being developed elsewhere in Knoxville at the time (e.g., North Hills, Sequoyah Hills, and Forest Heights), the lack of an adequate vehicle bridge across the Tennessee River made such development in South Knoxville risky. The completion of the Henley Street Bridge in 1931, however, alleviated this problem, and the first lots sold well.

As part of a promotional campaign, McClain offered $100 to whoever could come up with the best name for the new neighborhood. The winning entry, "Lindbergh Forest," was suggested by Emilee Cate. She submitted the name in honor of aviator Charles Lindbergh, who had completed his famous trans-Atlantic flight in 1927. Cate was the wife of Sheriff J. Carroll Cate, who as a deputy sheriff had unsuccessfully defended the Knox County Jail from a lynch mob during the Riot of 1919. The Cates lived on Chamberlain Boulevard.

Early residents of Lindbergh Forest included local business owners, local politicians, University of Tennessee professors, and Tennessee Valley Authority employees. During the 1930s, three consecutive mayors of Knoxville lived in Lindbergh Forest— John T. O'Connor, James Elmore, Sr., and Walter Mynatt. One resident, Dewey Holt, owner of the United Milk and Grocery Company, was reputedly a local bootlegger. When new residents moved into his house in the 1980s, they found hundreds of liquor bottles scattered around the house and grounds.

== Lindbergh Forest Historic District ==
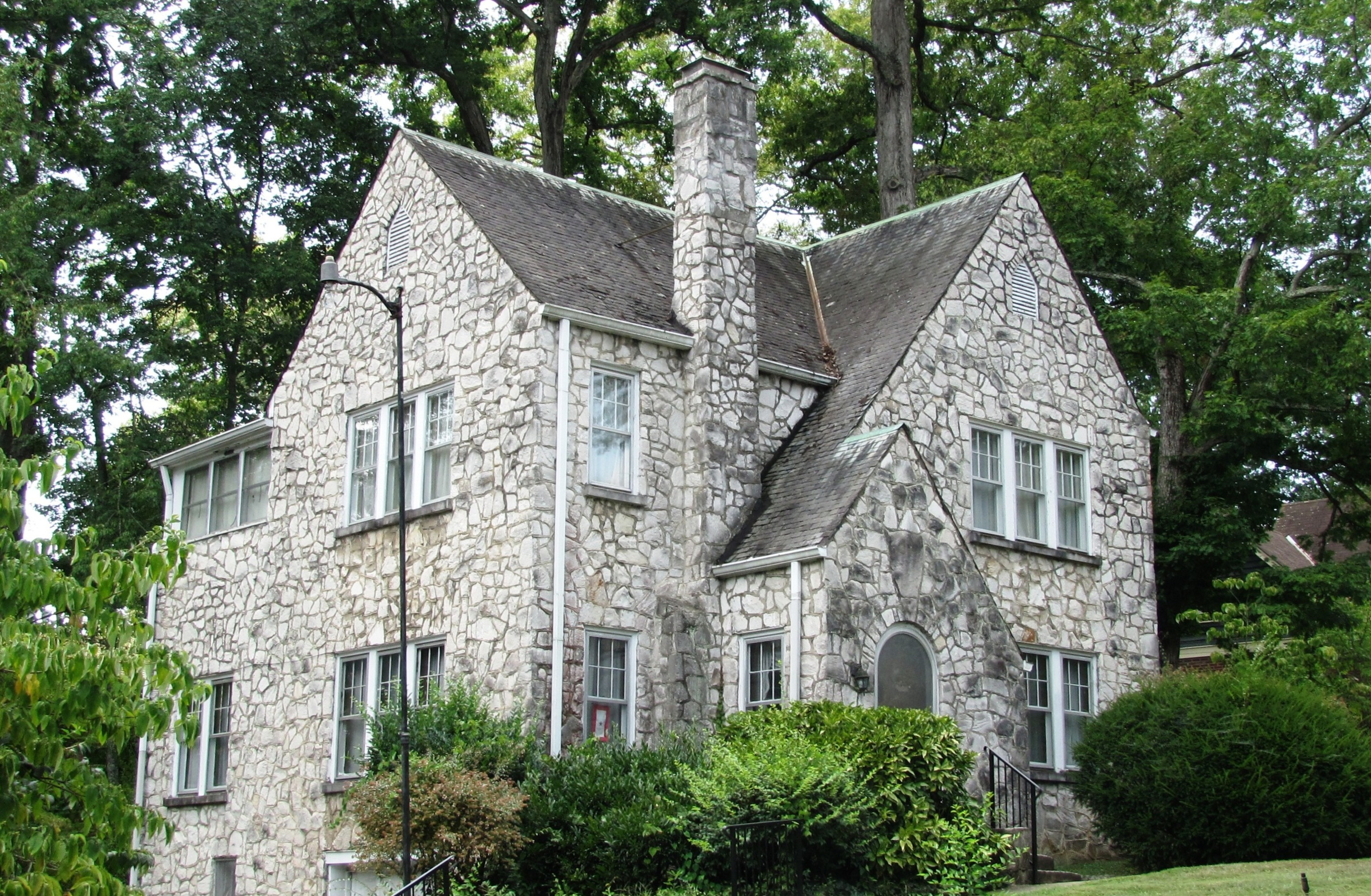
Tudor Revival-style house at 254 Chamberlain, built c. 1929

The Lindbergh Forest Historic District consists of 38 contributing houses and 10 contributing garages, all built between 1929 and 1947. The streetscapes and lamp posts have been included collectively in the listing as a contributing site. The Tudor Revival style is the most common architectural style in the district. Colonial Revival, Minimal Traditional, Bungalow, Spanish Eclectic, and Modern styles are also represented. The district includes two Lustron houses, which were a type of pre-fabricated house designed by the Lustron Corporation to meet post-World War II housing shortages.

The lamp posts in Lindbergh Forest remain from the early stages of the neighborhood's development. The posts, designed to resemble colonial-era gas lights, are 8 feet (2.4 m) tall and topped with wrought iron fixtures.

=== Notable houses ===
- 214 Druid Drive, a one-story Tudor Revival-style house built c. 1930. The house's exterior consists of stone with East Tennessee marble window sills.
- 240 Druid Drive, a 1 1/2-story Spanish Eclectic-style house built c. 1929. The exterior consists of course limestone walls with East Tennessee marble trim.
- 244 Druid Drive, a two-story Tudor Revival-style house with Colonial influence, built c. 1929. The house's exterior consists of rubble-coursed limestone veneer with brick trim.

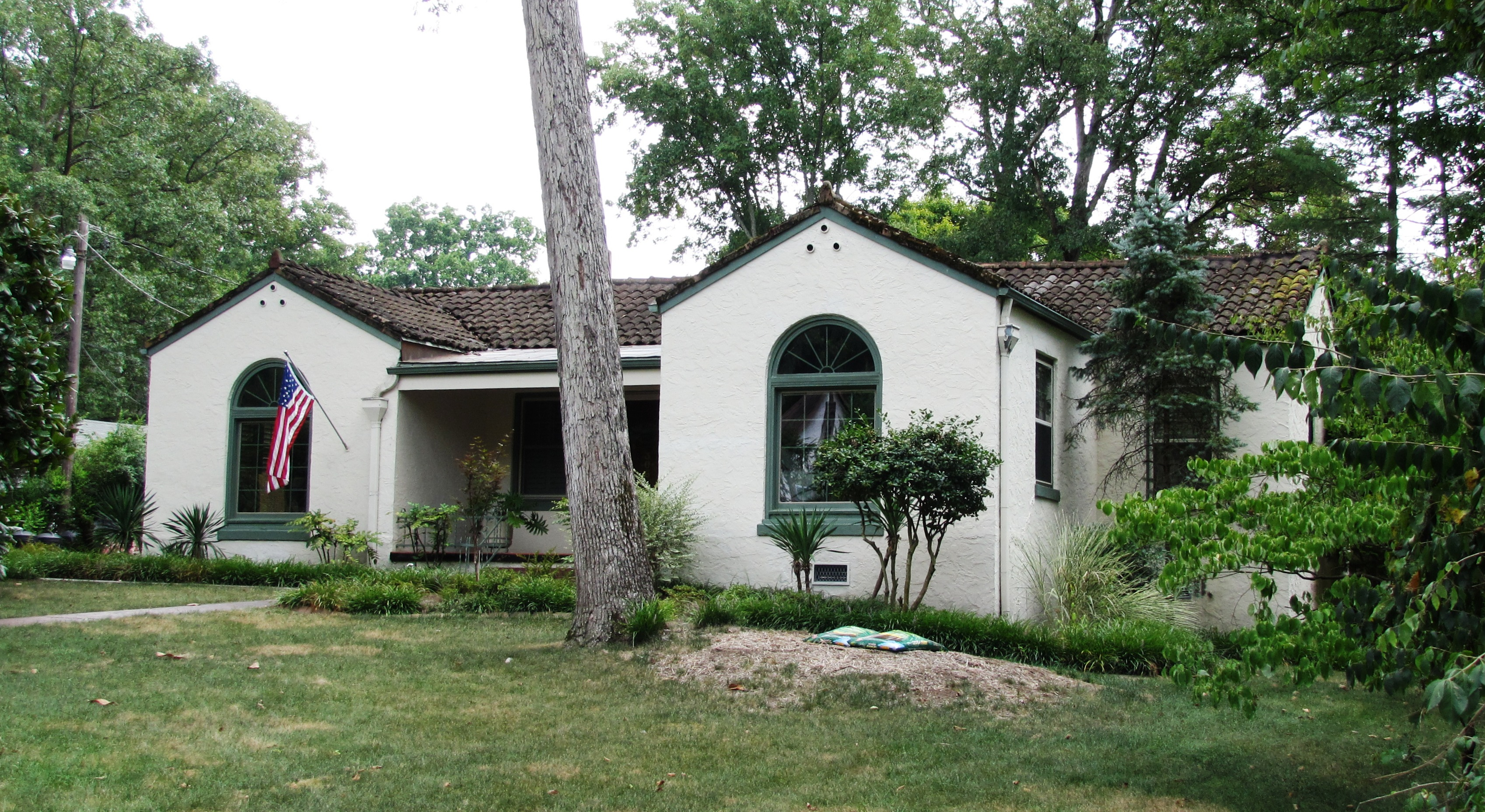
Spanish Mission-style house at 306 Chamberlain

- 222 Chamberlain Boulevard, a one-story Lustron house built c. 1947.
- 229 Chamberlain Boulevard, a two-story Eclectic house with Tudor Revival and Chateauesque influence, built c. 1930. The house's exterior consists of East Tennessee marble.
- 254 Chamberlain Boulevard, a two-story Tudor Revival-style house with limestone exterior, built c. 1929. This house is listed in the National Register nomination form as "214 Chamberlain."
- 301 Chamberlain Boulevard, a 1 1/2-story Tudor Revival-style house with Chateauesque influence, built c. 1929. The exterior consists of rusticated limestone with East Tennessee marble trim. This house is listed in the nomination form as "201 Chamberlain."
- 306 Chamberlain Boulevard, a one-story Mission-style house with Spanish Colonial influence, built c. 1929. The house has stuccoed walls and a terra cotta tile roof.

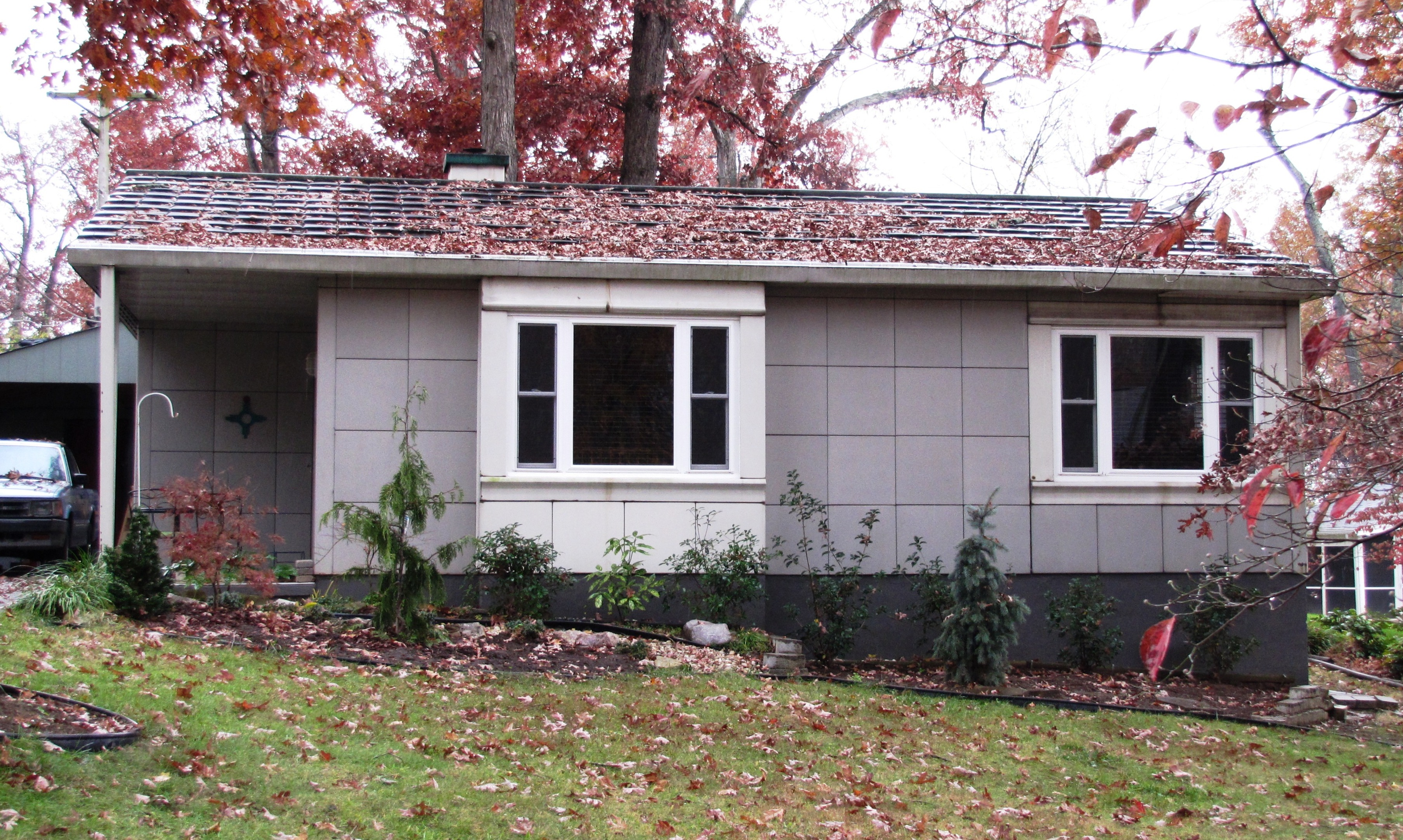
Lustron house at 222 Chamberlain

- 3419 Southwood Drive, a one-story Tudor Revival-style house built c. 1929. The house's exterior consists of brick and limestone, and includes an arched porch and a chimney with inset cross pattern.
- 3514 Southwood Drive, a 1 1/2-story Tudor Revival-style house with Minimal Traditional influence. The house's exterior consists of coursed East Tennessee marble rubble.
- 327 Winslow Drive, a one-story Colonial Revival-style house built c. 1937. The house's exterior consists of brick veneer with East Tennessee marble trim.
- 3510 Glenhurst Drive, a one-story Lustron house built c. 1947.
