= Weigel House =

Historic house in Tennessee, United States

- Monday House
- U.S. National Register of Historic Places
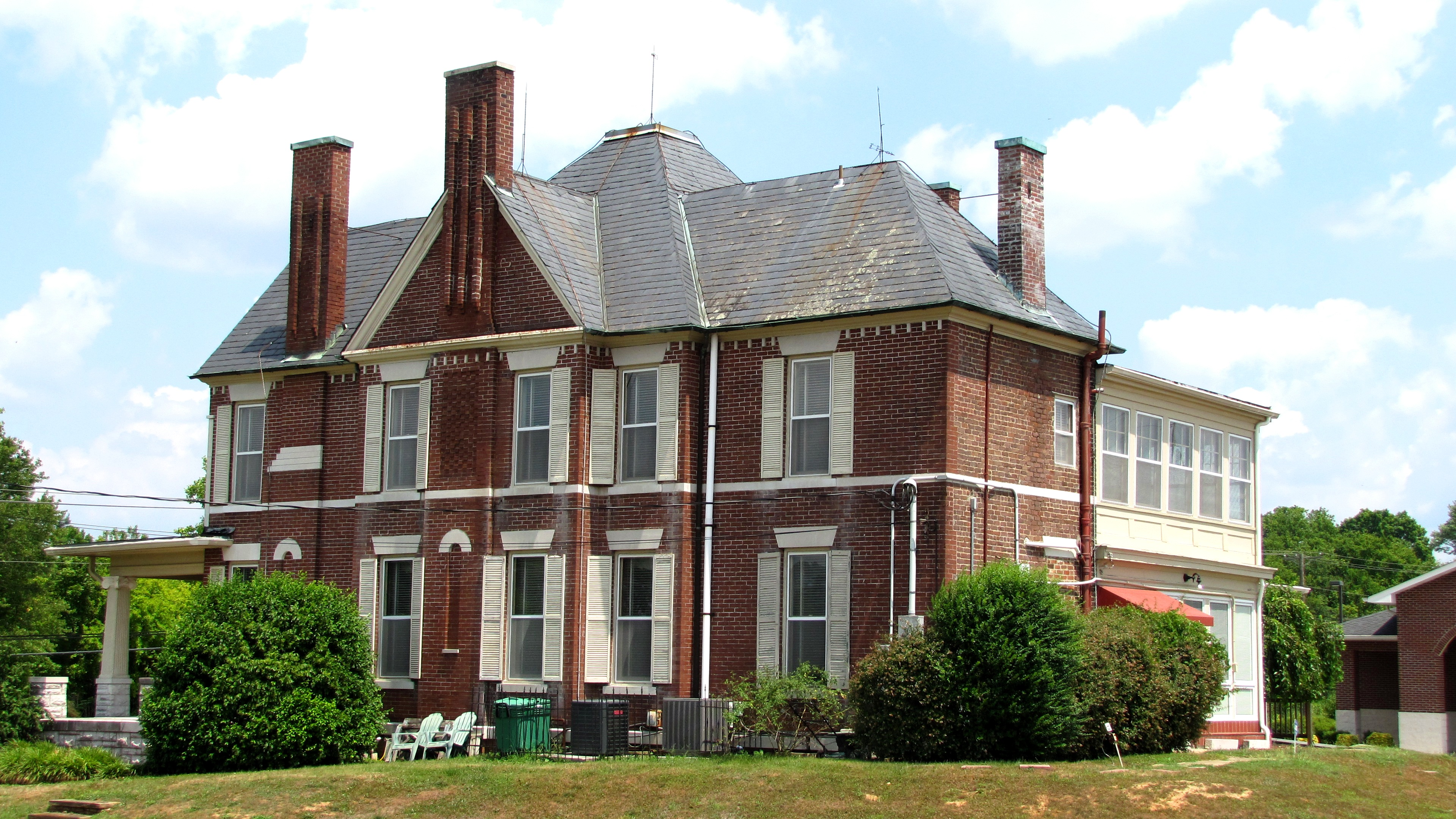
- Location: 2721 Asbury Rd; Knoxville, Tennessee, U.S.
- Coordinates: 35°57′10.09″N 83°49′46.35″W
- Built: 1893
- Architectural style: Queen Anne
- MPS: Knoxville and Knox County MPS
- NRHP reference No.: 01000394
- Added to NRHP: April 19, 2001

The Weigel House is a historic house built in 1893 at 2721 Asbury Road in Knoxville, Tennessee. It is also known as the Monday House, or the Osborne House. The house was constructed in the late 19th century in the Queen Anne style. It was one of the better-known homes of the Weigel family, who immigrated from Germany in the 19th century and were prominent in the dairy business, both in East and North Knox County, for generations. It is listed on the National Register of Historic Places as "Monday House" since 2001.

== History ==
The estate comprised the house, a large barn, a garden patio, a detached 2 car garage, and 3 outbuildings. It is a brick structure with two and a half stories. Although the architect of the house is unknown, deed research suggests that Jonathan Osborne had the house built.

The Weigel family were the second owners of the house, and owned a chain of convenience stores.

=== Shell family ===
From 1998 until 2001, the house was used as a residence by Steven and Karla Shell and their children. The house was placed on the historical registry by the Shell family. During their ownership of this house, the Shells completed a restoration of the home in which they remodeled the kitchen and main bathroom. This restoration reversed the remodeling project undertaken by the previous owners sometime during the 1970s. In that project, the previous owners had laid carpet over the original hardwood floors and installed a drop ceiling in the kitchen, where they had also replaced all cabinetry.

=== Cruze Farm at Asbury ===
His son, Earl Cruze and wife, Cheri, bought land in Asbury, built a processing plant and began bottling milk in 1990 under the name Cruze Dairy Farm. In September 2017, Earl Cruze's daughter Colleen (née Cruze) and Manjit Bhatti purchased the Weigel House, and formed the 'Cruze Farm at Asbury'; serving fresh churned ice cream and pizza. It started as a summer ice cream popup on Gay Street. Although some customers refer to this location as "the farm," the family dairy farm is located further east in Riverdale and is not open to the public.

== See also ==
- National Register of Historic Places listings in Knox County, Tennessee
