= Boyd–Harvey House =

Historic house in Knoxville, Tennessee, United States

- U.S. National Register of Historic Places
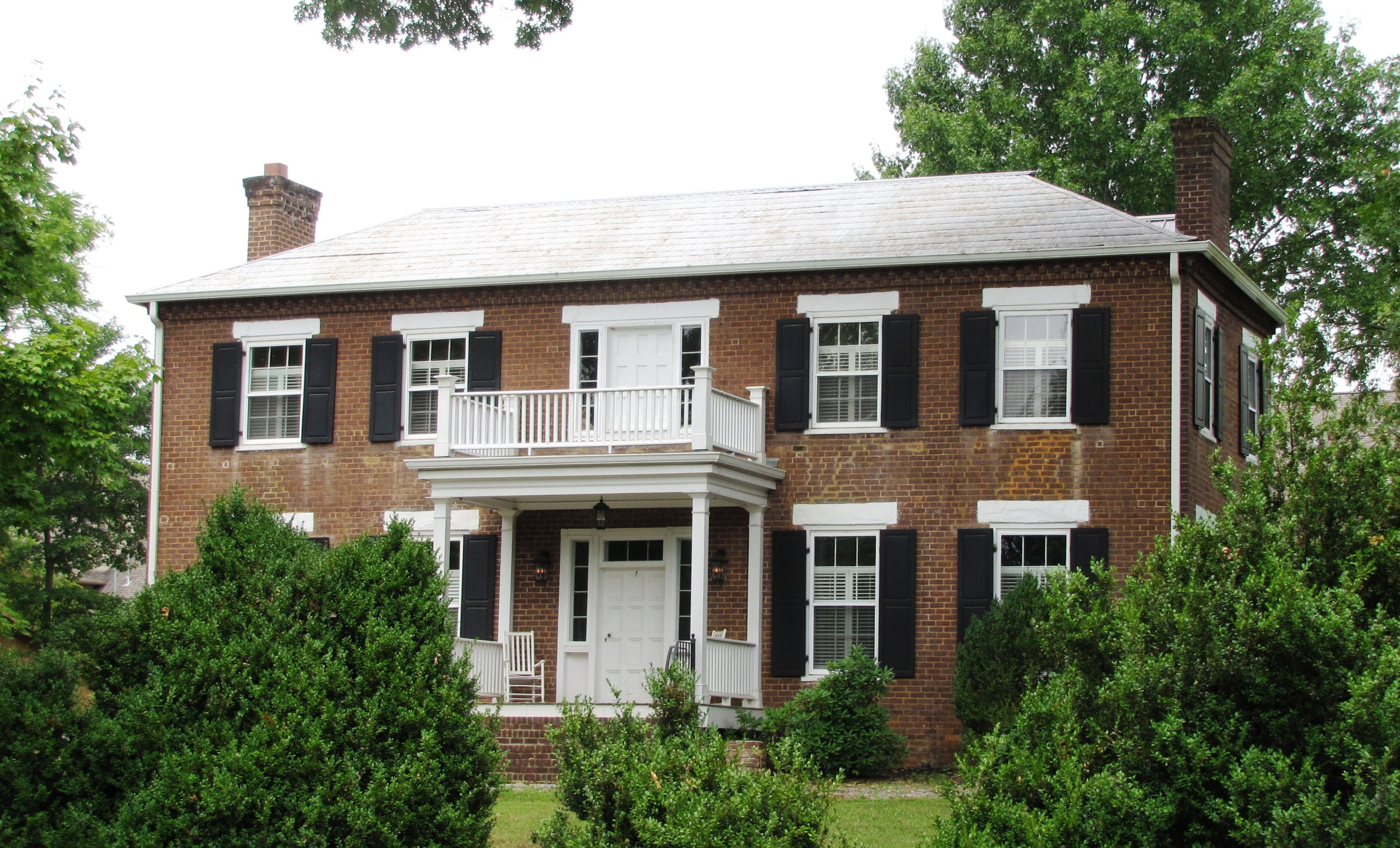
- Location: Harvey Rd. Knoxville, Tennessee
- Coordinates: 35°50′4″N 84°10′48″W
- Architect: Thomas Boyd
- Architectural style: Federal
- NRHP reference No.: 85002774
- Added to NRHP: November 7, 1985

The Boyd–Harvey House is an historic home located at 1321 Harvey Road in Knoxville, Tennessee, United States. It was designed in the Federal style and constructed by Thomas Boyd, Jr., and is listed on the National Register of Historic Places.

== Description ==
The original house is believed to have been constructed in 1824, with a rear wing added later. Both the original house and the rear wing are constructed of brick, with a corbelled brick cornice above. There is a one-story shed roof porch along the front of the ante-bellum home. The original house has a hip roof, and the rear wing has a gable roof. Interior features of note include federal style fireplace mantels, fluted trim, built-in cupboards flanking the west fireplace, and a stone dairy in the addition.

In 1995, the home still had two separate staircases: one leading to the front of the house and one leading to the rear of the house. In 2019, after major renovations in 2004–2007, the home had 3 staircases, one to the master suite up front, and a separate staircase to each of the back 2 bedrooms.

== See also ==
- National Register of Historic Places listings in Knox County, Tennessee
