= Baker Peters House =

Coordinates: 35°54′44″N 84°4′54.64″W

Baker Peters house as of 2019 The Baker Peters House is an antebellum house located on the south side of Kingston Pike in Knoxville, Tennessee, near the intersection of Peters Road and Kingston Pike. The house is a two-story Greek Revival structure. It has a porte-cochere on the east side for carriages, and a rear wing that projects out on the southwest side of the house. It also has a columned, two-story front porch. The main body of the house is brick, but the rear wing was originally finished in wood siding.

It was constructed in 1840 by Dr. James Harvey Baker, a local physician. He continued to own the house until his death during the Civil War. Harvey Baker was a Confederate supporter and his son Abner was a Confederate soldier. Dr. Baker was killed at the home by Union troops who traveled along Kingston Pike during a raid of Knoxville in June 1863. A marker in front of the home incorrectly claims he was killed while treating wounded Confederate soldiers in the house in 1864. There is no evidence he ever used the home as a hospital for wounded troops. In fact, Dr. Baker is likely one of the first people killed by Union forces in Knox County according to historian Joan Markel at the McClung Museum.

The Union troops fired through a barricaded door in the home, and hit Dr. Baker. His son Abner was away at war at the time of the incident, but became a historical figure upon his return in 1865 when he shot and killed a man named William Hall in downtown Knoxville. Hall worked for the clerk of court and fought for the Union during the Civil War. Early accounts of the shooting make no mention of it being an act of vengeance. Instead, newspapers claim the fight was between two people with an "old grudge" who were on opposite sides of the war, with partisan papers mostly disagreeing on whether the shooting was self-defense. A book published in 1976 claims Abner believed the man he shot was somehow involved in his father's death. Whatever the motivation, Abner was immediately captured and jailed when the shooting occurred. That night, an angry mob of Unionists overran the jail, took Abner outside, and hanged him from a tree in Downtown Knoxville.

The Baker house was sold in the late 19th century to George Peters.

The Baker Peters House was one of several antebellum plantation homes on Kingston Pike. Mabry Hood House, located to the west on Kingston Pike, was demolished in the late 20th century to make way for Pellissippi Parkway. The Baker Peters House avoided a similar fate, but the site has been compromised/saved by commercial uses. The building itself now houses a restaurant and Dentist office, while the land around it is occupied by parking lots and businesses. Crescent Bend (The Armstrong-Lockett House), Bleak House, and Knollwood, all located farther to the east on Kingston Pike, remain in good condition.

The upstairs of the Baker Peters house is currently in a renovation process and plans to re-open as a restaurant and piano bar in early-2016. The downstairs of the house is a dental office and has been since 1989.
