= Mabry Hood House =

Coordinates: 35.90281°N 84.11877°W

The Mabry Hood House, also known as the Mabry Hood Mansion, and the Upland South Plantation, was a former cotton plantation and historic antebellum style plantation home once located on the south side of Kingston Pike at the intersection of Mabry Hood Road in Knox County, Tennessee. The vacant home sat in the path of Pellissippi Parkway and was demolished in 1983 after falling into disrepair.

== History ==
Mabry Hood was a two-story, Greek Revival style home with a columned, two-story high front portico. Although primarily brick, wood siding was located on the front face of the home behind the portico.

The productive, 3,000-acre (12 km^{2}) plantation was occupied from c. 1830 through the early 20th Century by the George Mabry family. George Washington Mabry (21 July 1823 – 23 July 1912) married Jeanette Hume in 1846, and built the mansion c. 1851, five years after the marriage. The mansion was constructed by slaves. Mabry was recorded as having 18 slaves in the 1850 census, but only 8 slaves in the 1860 census.

== The Mabry family ==
By 1860, George Mabry and his wife Jeanette had at least five children. However, they also had a residence in what is now downtown Knoxville. Robert Tracy McKenzie noted that George Mabry declined to take the Confederate loyalty oath, which complicated his ability to travel to his west Knox County farm while the region was under the control of the Confederacy. His relationship did not improve when Union forces took control of East Tennessee, since he admitted that one reason he did not actively support the C.S.A. was his expectation that they would lose the war.

His brother, Joseph Alexander Mabry II (c. 1825 - October 19, 1882) and nephew Joseph Alexander Mabry III (May 23, 1855 – October 19, 1882), both immortalized in Mark Twain's Life on the Mississippi, are also associated with this estate. However, Joseph Alexander Mabry II built a home in east Knoxville in 1858, the Mabry-Hazen House, Knoxville, which is now a historic house museum.

The family's wealth, prominence and political connections are illustrated by how Jeanette Mabry avoided harm during the U.S. Civil War. Although George Mabry was officially "neutral", his Scottish-born wife was an outspoken opponent of secession. Robert Tracy McKenzie reports that Mrs. Mabry threatened to return to Scotland if the South was successful, and informed her husband that she would not live in the C.S.A. even if "Washington and Jefferson were both raised from the dead". Her wealth, prominence and being female, as well as having Joseph Mabry - an early secessionist leader - as a brother-in-law, are cited as reasons she was not harmed. Their neighbors, the James Harvey Baker family, did not share her views.

== Demolition ==
The house was last occupied in the late 1960s, when it was sold. It was sold again to an engineering firm in 1974. During its abandonment, the house fell into a state of disrepair and was burglarized and vandalized on multiple occasions. It was finally demolished in early March 1983.

Archaeological investigations were conducted in the early 1990s in preparation for the extension of Pellissippi Parkway. The Mabry estate was classified by this investigation as an Upland South plantation, only a limited amount of cotton was found to have been grown on the estate. In addition to the mansion, two slaves quarters were identified and artifacts recovered. The site was considered significant for the insights it provided on the lives of the slaves and their relationship with their masters.

The Mabry Hood House was one of several antebellum plantation homes located along Kingston Pike in the western Knox County. (The nearby Baker Peters House and Statesview, located near the intersection of Kingston Pike and Peters Road, still stand.) Unlike Knollwood, which was located on the top of Bearden Hill, the Mabry Hood House sat close to modern-day Kingston Pike, and near grade.
