= Ivan Racheff House =

Historic house in Knoxville, Tennessee, United States

- U.S. National Register of Historic Places
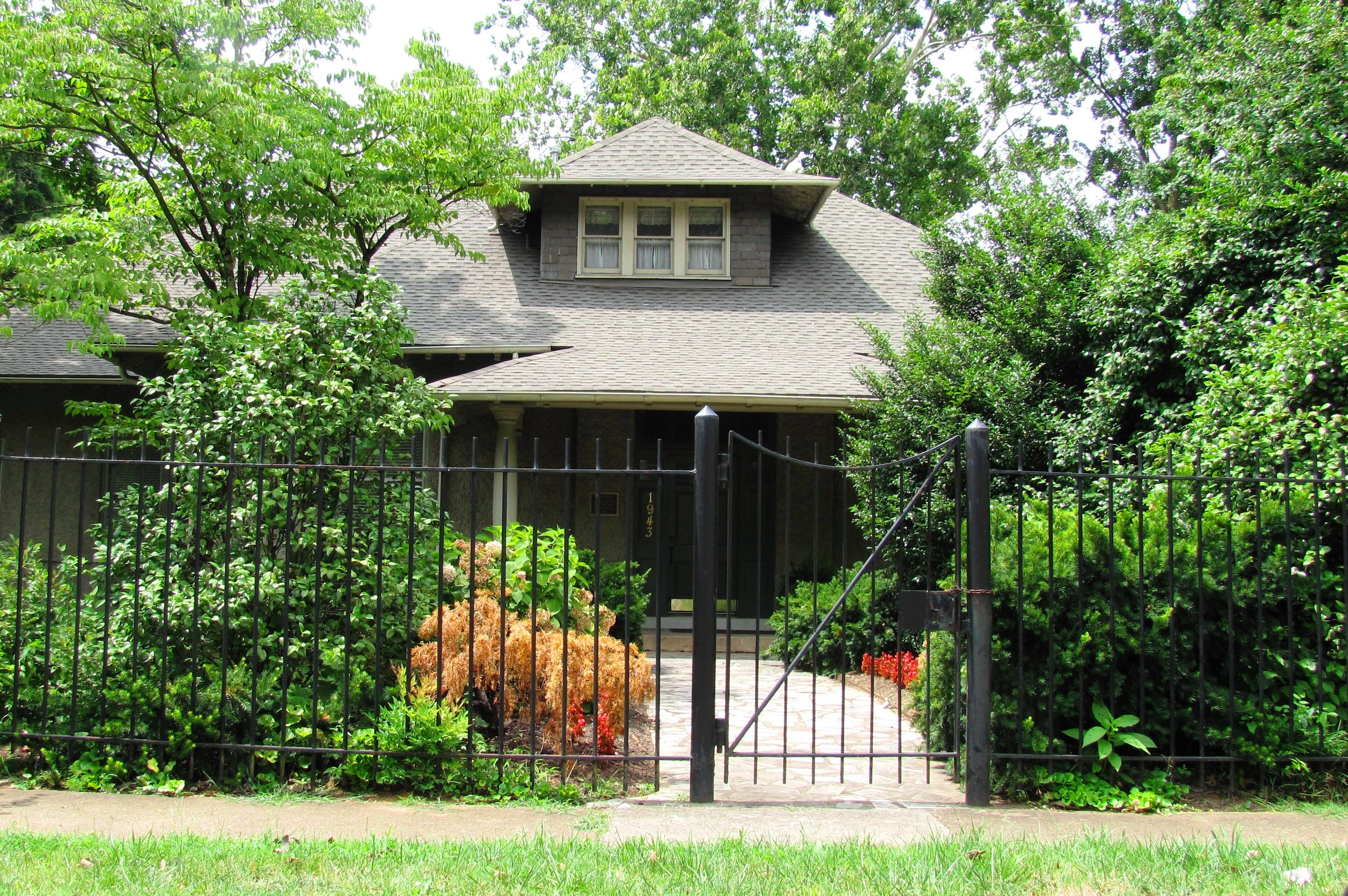
- Location: 1943 Tennessee Ave. Knoxville, Tennessee
- Coordinates: 35°58′46″N 83°57′12″W
- NRHP reference No.: 02000810
- Added to NRHP: July 17, 2002

The Ivan Racheff House is a historic house with gardens at 1943 Tennessee Avenue in Knoxville, Tennessee, United States. The house was originally built in 1902, but was later modified by Knoxville Iron Works president Ivan Racheff for use as an office and apartment. Racheff Gardens was established by Racheff in 1947. The house is now used by the Tennessee Federation of Garden Clubs, who maintain the gardens. The property is listed on the National Register of Historic Places.
