= Lincoln Park United Methodist Church =

Historic church in Tennessee, United States

- U.S. National Register of Historic Places
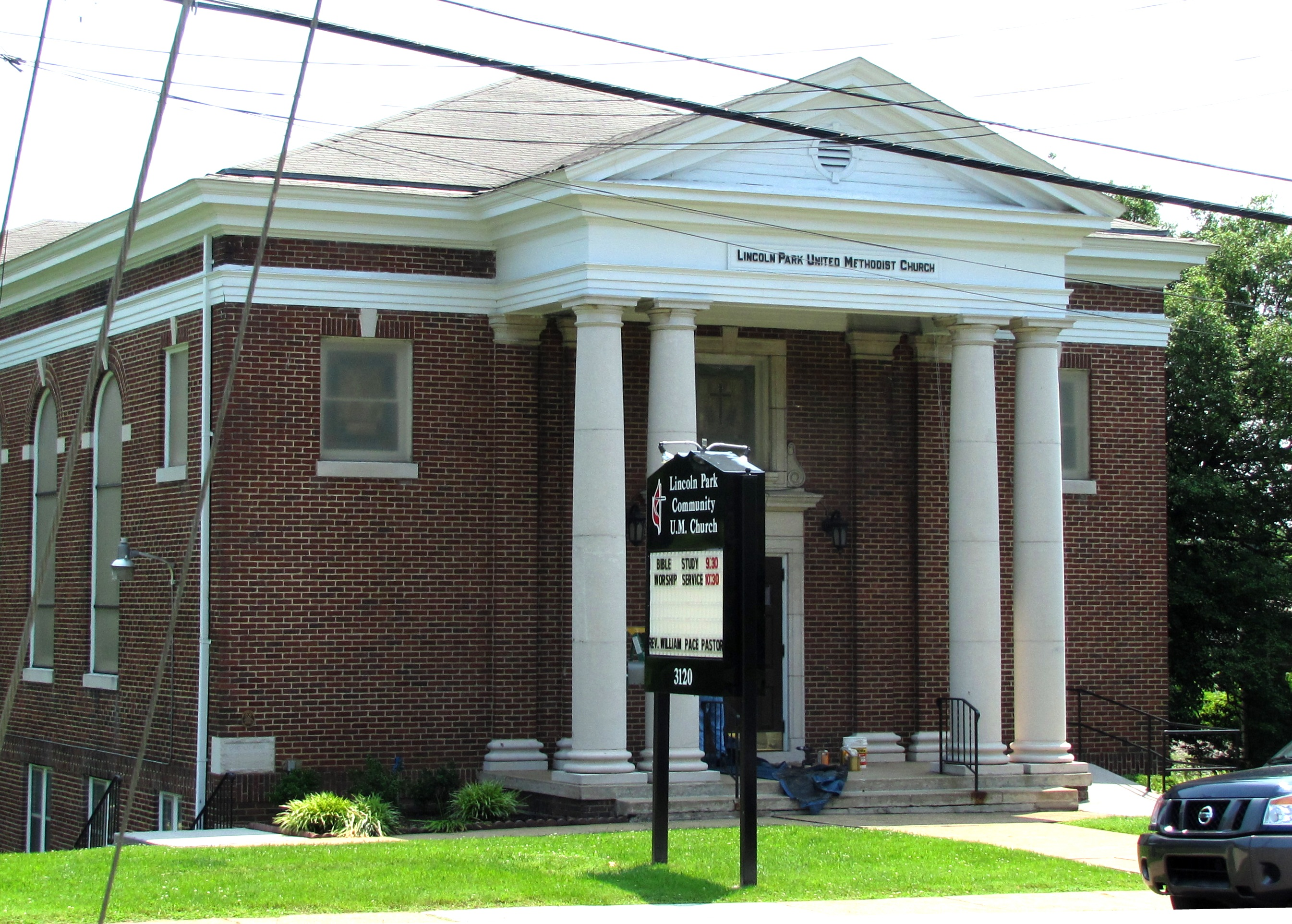

- Location within Tennessee Location within the United States
- Location: 3120 Pershing St., Knoxville, Tennessee
- Coordinates: 36°0′3″N 83°56′12″W
- Area: less than one acre
- Built: 1926
- Architectural style: Classical Revival
- MPS: Knoxville and Knox County MPS
- NRHP reference No.: 05000695
- Added to NRHP: July 14, 2005

Lincoln Park United Methodist Church is a historic church at 3120 Pershing Street in Knoxville, Tennessee.

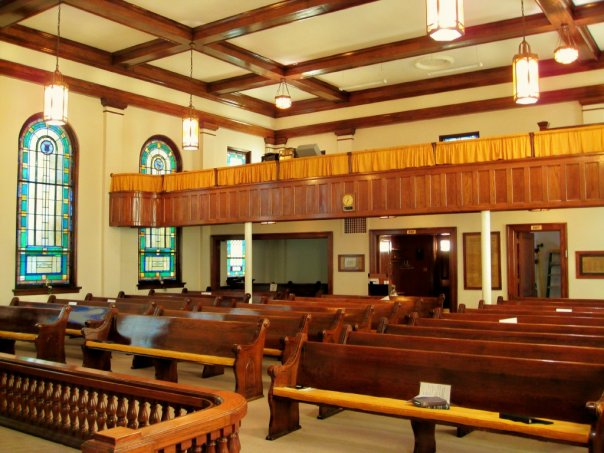
Church sanctuary

The church is a brick-veneered frame building that was built in 1926. The identity of its architect is not known, but the design suggests the work of Charles I. Barber. The entrance to the building is framed by columns with Doric capitals. Interior furnishings include oak pews, stained glass windows, a coffered ceiling over the sanctuary, and an altar balustrade.

The building was listed on the National Register of Historic Places in 2005.
