= Captain James Newman House =

Historic house in Tennessee, United States

Coordinates: 35.95380°N 83.69977°W

- Capt. James Newman House
- U.S. National Register of Historic Places
- Location: 8906 Newman Ln. Knoxville, Tennessee
- Built: 1893
- MPS: Knoxville and Knox County MPS
- NRHP reference No.: 98001304
- Added to NRHP: October 30, 1998

The Captain James Newman House is a historic home in Knox County, Tennessee, United States, located at 8906 Newman Lane. It is listed on the National Register of Historic Places.

The house was built adjacent to the French Broad River in 1898 by Captain James Newman, who owned and operated a riverboat on the river. Like most houses built along the French Broad River in that era, the house had a steamboat landing in its front yard. The two-story house is an example of Queen Anne style architecture in the United States.

The house was listed on the National Register in 1998. It is privately owned.
