= Seven Islands Methodist Church =

Historic church in Tennessee, United States

- U.S. National Register of Historic Places
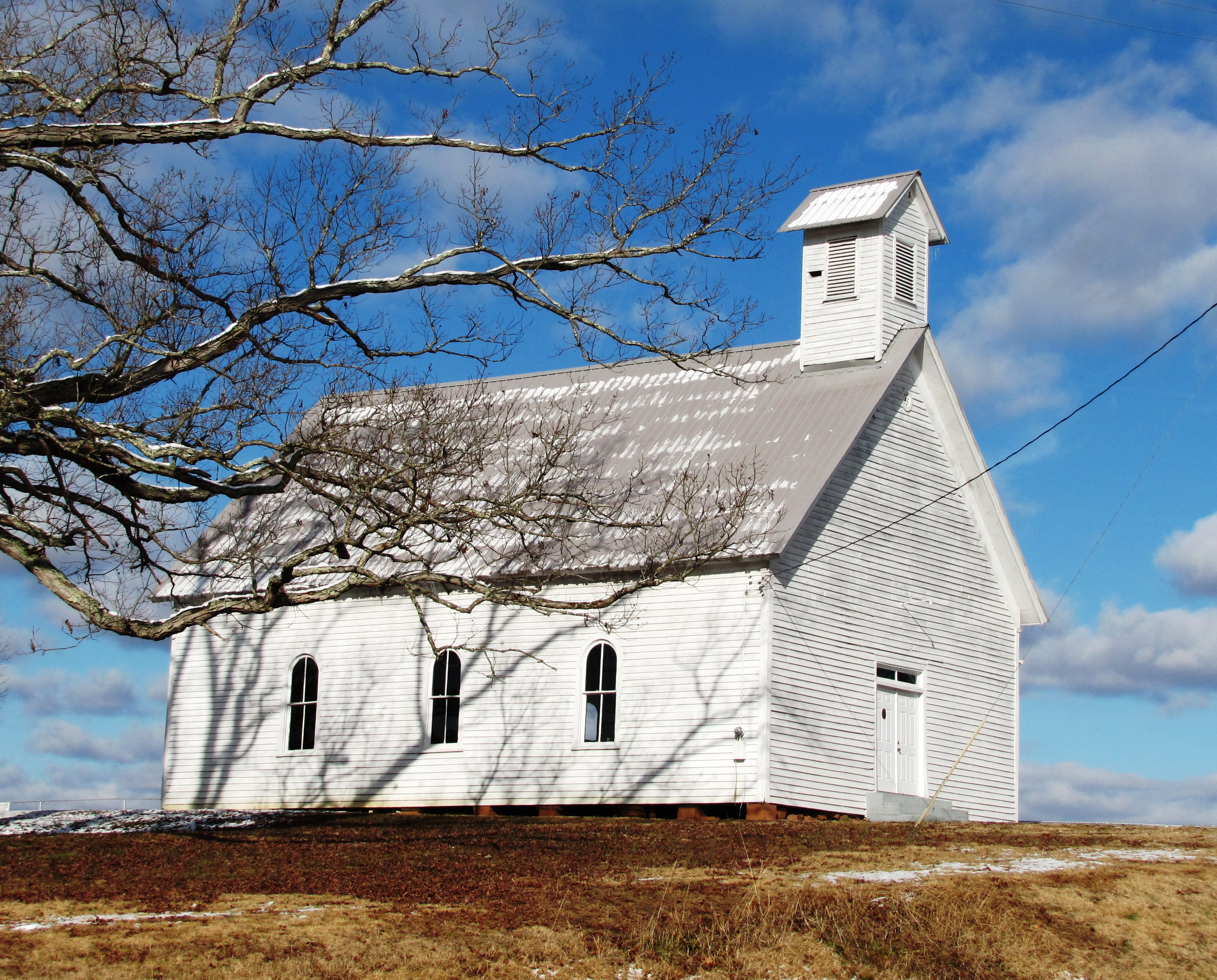

- Location within Tennessee Location within the United States
- Location: 8100 Seven Islands Road, Knoxville, Tennessee
- Coordinates: 35°57′5″N 83°42′19″W
- Area: 0.8 acres (0.32 ha)
- Built: c. 1865
- MPS: Knoxville and Knox County MPS
- NRHP reference No.: 97000244
- Added to NRHP: March 18, 1997

Seven Islands Methodist Church is a historic church located near the south bank of the French Broad River in Knox County, Tennessee. The church building is listed on the National Register of Historic Places.

The congregation was founded in 1803, the first Methodist congregation established in Knox County. The church was built circa 1865. As of 1994 it was being used by a non-denominational congregation. The building was listed on the National Register in 1997.

The church is part of a community that also includes a log house from the early 1800s, timber frame and brick homes from the 1830s and 1850s, and other churches. The Peter Keener home, located one quarter mile from the church and built circa 1790s still stands today. The Seven Islands Wildlife Refuge has been created to maintain the 19th century history of this area.

== See also ==
- Leroy Keener House
