= Leroy Keener House =

Historic house in Tennessee, United States

- U.S. National Register of Historic Places
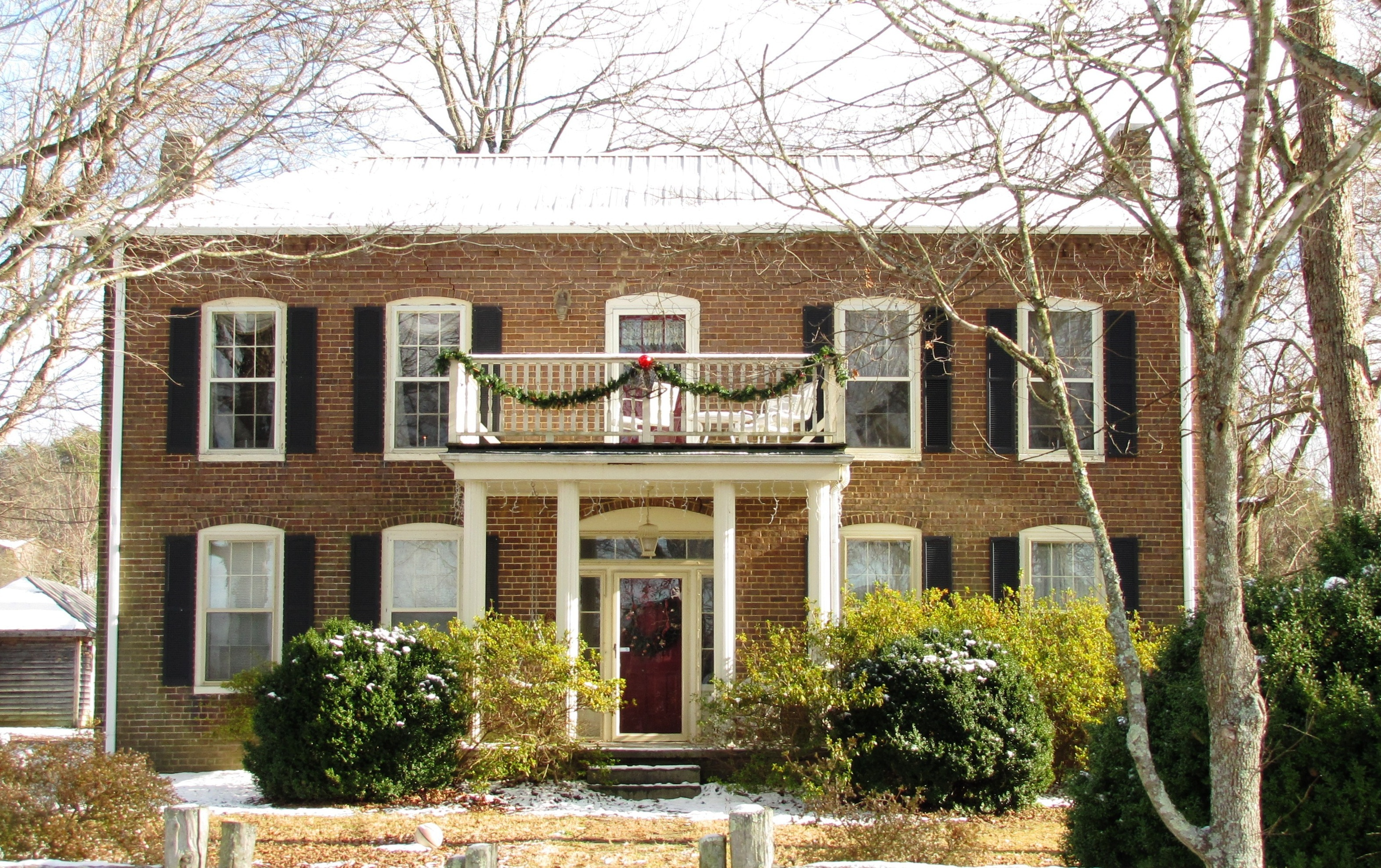
- Thomas F Hunt- Owner
- Location: 3506 Woodlawn School Road, Knoxville, Tennessee 37920
- Coordinates: 35°56′52″N 83°43′23″W
- Built: 1842
- Built by: Leroy Keener
- Architectural style: Federal
- MPS: Knoxville and Knox County MPS
- NRHP reference No.: 97001440
- Added to NRHP: November 13, 1997

The Leroy Keener House also known as the Keener-Hunt House is a historic home located at 3506 Woodlawn School Road in Knoxville, Tennessee, United States. Designed in the Federal style, the house was built in 1842 by Leroy Keener. Leroy was an early Knox County farmer. It was listed on the National Register of Historic Places in 1997 for its architecture and role in the area's early settlement.

The Keener family originated when early settler, Peter Keener, moved to the Seven Islands area from Pennsylvania. The home of Peter Keener, a two-story log structure used to stand nearby on Seven Islands Road. Leroy Keener built his house in 1842, shortly after his marriage to Mary Jane McCallie. Keener's descendants occupied the house until it was bought by the Kelley Family in 1913. They occupied the house until 1972, then purchased by the Hunt family who still occupy it today.

The house is a two-story brick structure. A few outbuildings still stand near the house, including a Well House.

== See also ==
- Seven Islands Methodist Church
