= Thomas J. Walker House =

Historic house in Tennessee, United States

- Formerly listed on the U.S. National Register of Historic Places
- Location within Tennessee Location within the United States
- Location: 645 Mars Hill Rd; Knoxville, Tennessee
- Coordinates: 35°56′20″N 84°3′34″W
- Built: 1839
- MPS: Knoxville and Knox County MPS
- NRHP reference No.: 98000279

Significant dates
- Added to NRHP: April 1, 1998
- Removed from NRHP: 2008

The Thomas J. Walker House was a historic home located at 645 Mars Hill Road in Knoxville, Tennessee, United States. It was listed on the National Register of Historic Places.

When it was listed on the National Register, it was one of the few brick homes from the early 19th century remaining in Knox County. It was originally nominated for the National Register as a representative of the area's early settlement and architecture. In the early 20th century the house was altered by the addition of a white columned portico, but it retained most of its original exterior appearance and interior details.

In 2002 the house burned, and the remains of the structure were demolished in 2003. The house was subsequently removed from the National Register on July 24, 2008. The surrounding land was considered for redevelopment in March 2002 and was offered for sale in November 2007.
