= Alfred Buffat Homestead =

Historic house in Tennessee, United States

- U.S. National Register of Historic Places
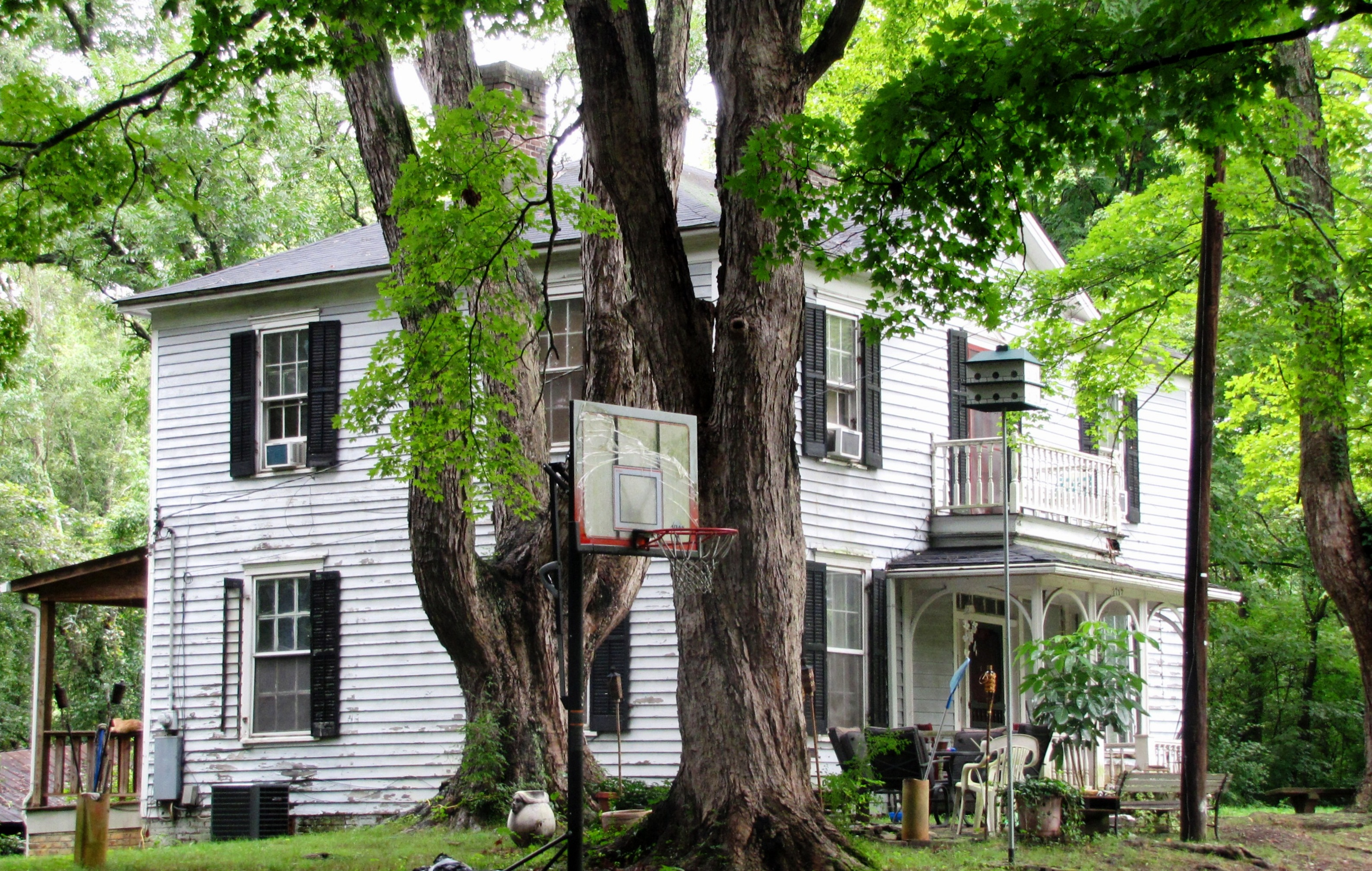

- Location within Tennessee Location within the United States
- Location: 1 mi N of Knoxville on Love Creek Rd
- Nearest city: Knoxville, Tennessee
- Coordinates: 36°1′35.11″N 83°51′41.31″W
- Architectural style: Italianate
- NRHP reference No.: 75001761
- Added to NRHP: April 1, 1975

The Alfred Buffat Homestead, also known as The Maples, is a historic home with several surviving outbuildings located on Love Creek Road in Knoxville, Tennessee, United States. Its architectural style is Italianate.

Alfred Buffat was a French-Swiss immigrant. He built the first story of The Maples in 1867 for his bride. A second story was added three years later. The house has wood siding, with a modest front porch. The property originally included a grist mill and other buildings. In addition to the main house, the miller's cottage, smokehouses, wash house, barns and utility buildings are still standing.

The house is a private residence, and is not open to the public. It was listed on the National Register of Historic Places in 1975.
