= New Salem Methodist Church =

Historic church in Tennessee, United States

- U.S. National Register of Historic Places
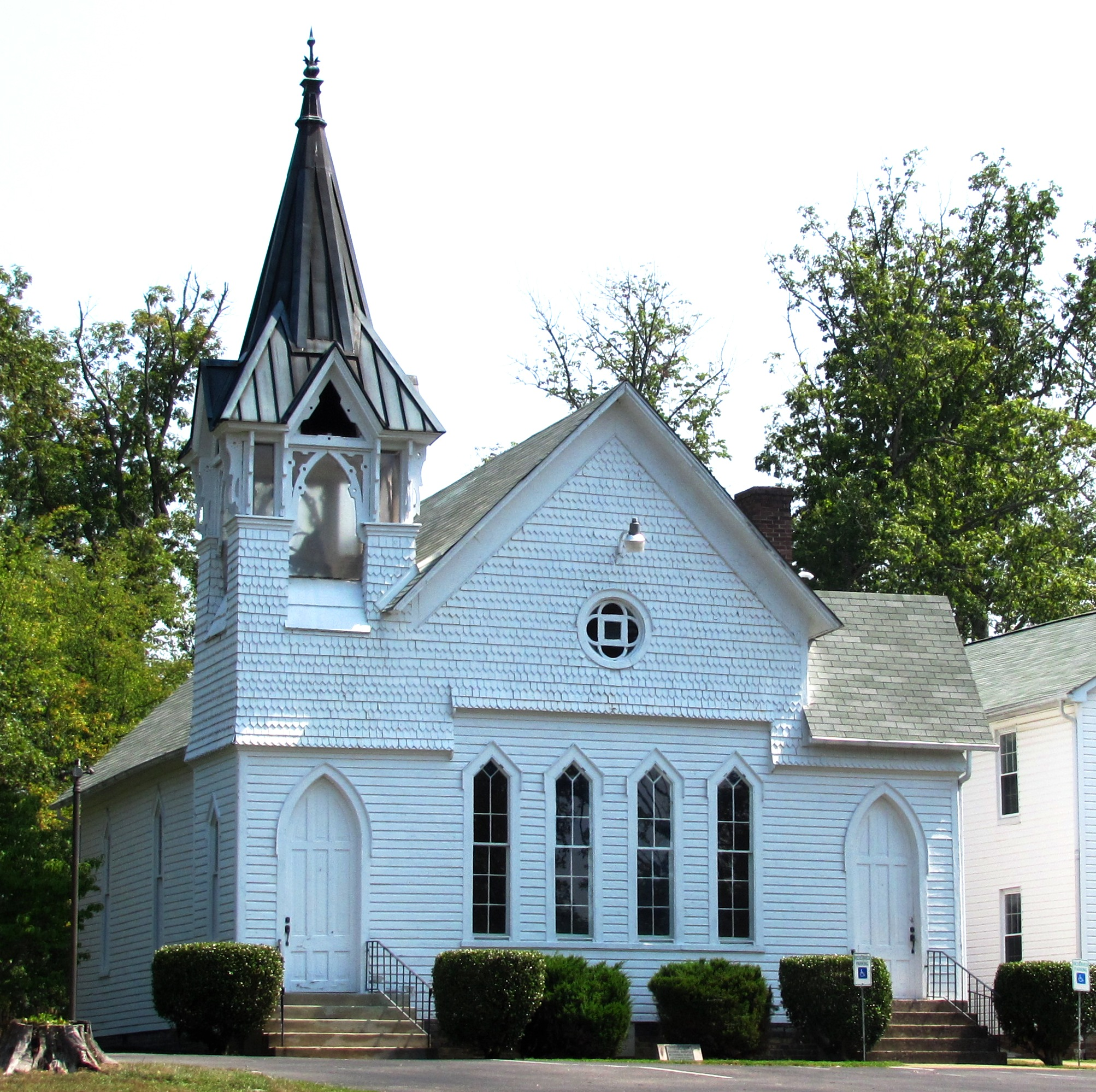

- Location within Tennessee Location within the United States
- Nearest city: Knoxville, Tennessee
- Coordinates: 35°53′6″N 83°53′54″W
- Area: 1.9 acres (0.77 ha)
- Built: 1898
- Architectural style: Late Gothic Revival, Carpenter Gothic
- NRHP reference No.: 83003044
- Added to NRHP: August 11, 1983

New Salem Methodist Church is a historic United Methodist church on Tipton Station Road in Knoxville, Tennessee.

It was built in 1898 and added to the National Register of Historic Places in 1983.

In 2013, Knox Heritage gave the church a "Fantastic Fifteen" award in recognition of historic stewardship.

In 2023, the congregation disaffiliated from the United Methodist Church and joined the Global Methodist Church.
