= Knollwood (Bearden Hill) =

Historic house in Tennessee, United States

- U.S. National Register of Historic Places
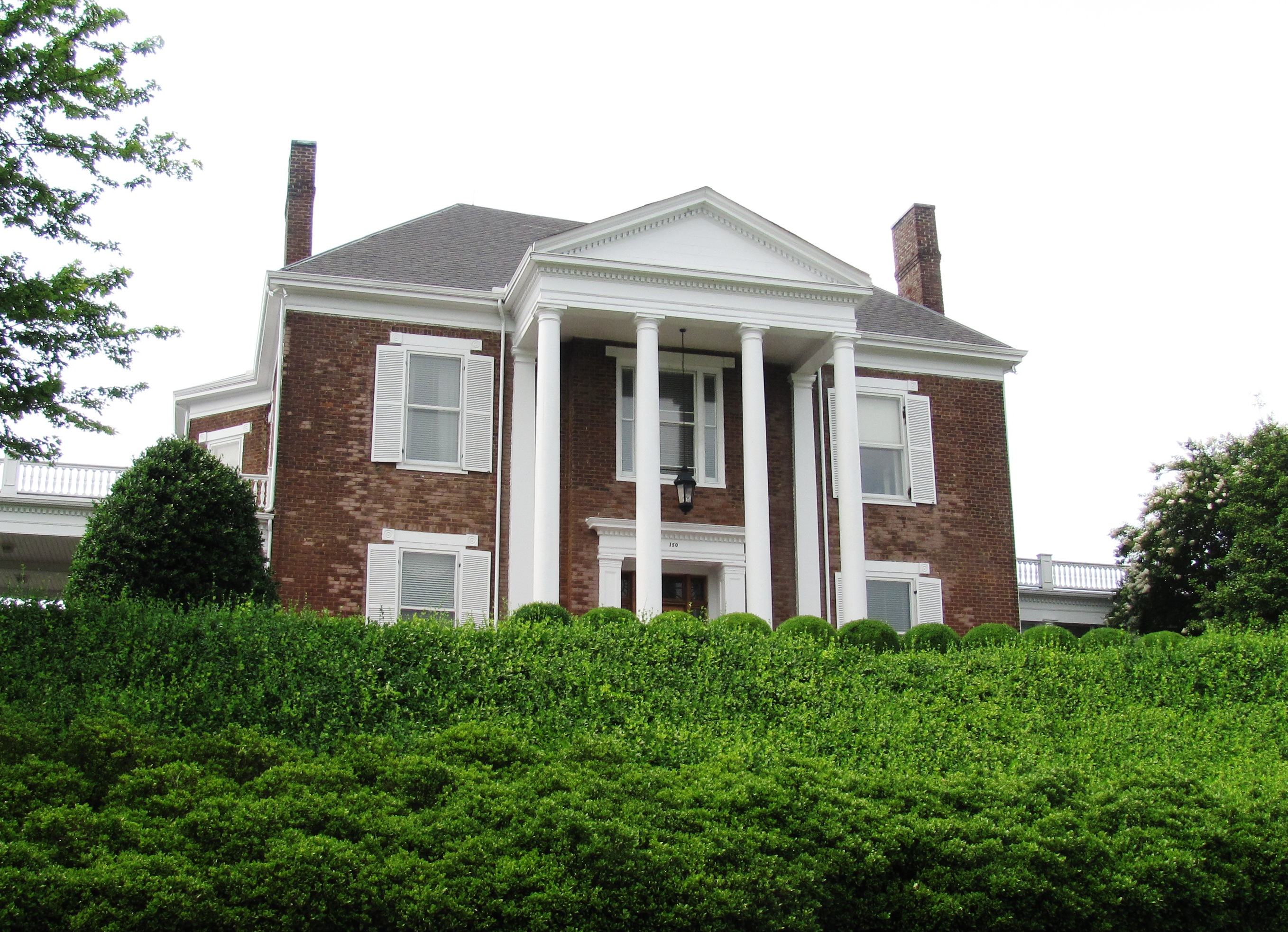

- Location within Tennessee Location within the United States
- Location: 6411 Kingston Pike, Knoxville, Tennessee
- Coordinates: 35°56′2″N 84°0′32″W
- Area: 9 acres (3.6 ha)
- Built: 1851
- Architect: Eckle & Newman
- Architectural style: Georgian Revival
- NRHP reference No.: 75001762
- Added to NRHP: May 12, 1975

Knollwood is an antebellum historic house at 6411 Kingston Pike in Knoxville, Tennessee, United States. It is also known as Knollwood Hall, Major Reynolds House, the Tucker Mansion and Bearden Hill. The home is listed on the National Register of Historic Places.

The home and plantation were developed on land purchased from James White, the founder of Knoxville. Construction was supervised by Major Robert Reynolds' sister, Rebecca, while he was serving in the Mexican–American War. The house was completed in 1851. The home was originally built in the Federal style, but neoclassical details were added in the late 19th century. A later owner, Charles W. Griffith, added the distinctive front porch in 1919.

Confederate General James Longstreet used the home as his headquarters in late 1863; he is reputed to have planned the Battle of Fort Sanders, part of the Knoxville Campaign, in the dining room.

Knollwood was one of several antebellum plantations located along Kingston Pike in what was then western Knox County. Others included the Baker Peters House, Armstrong-Lockett House (Crescent Bend), Bleak House, and the Mabry Hood House (now demolished). Architecturally, Knollwood has a more significant presence than the Baker Peters House and Mabry Hood House.

The Harvey Tucker family, wealthy Knoxvillians involved in the hospitality industry (i.e., Quality Courts, now part of Choice Hotels, Inc.), owned the house in the mid-to-late 20th century. Through the era when the Tucker family lived at Knollwood, the sweeping front lawn remained undeveloped. The house was known informally as the Tucker Mansion in this era. The plantation itself and the front lawn no longer exist, due to surrounding development. The mansion, itself, survives and has been renovated, but it now serves as the headquarters for Schaad Companies. It is not open to the public, but has been used by Knox Heritage for a social event.
