= North Hills Historic District (Knoxville) =

Historic district in Tennessee, United States

- U.S. National Register of Historic Places
- U.S. Historic district
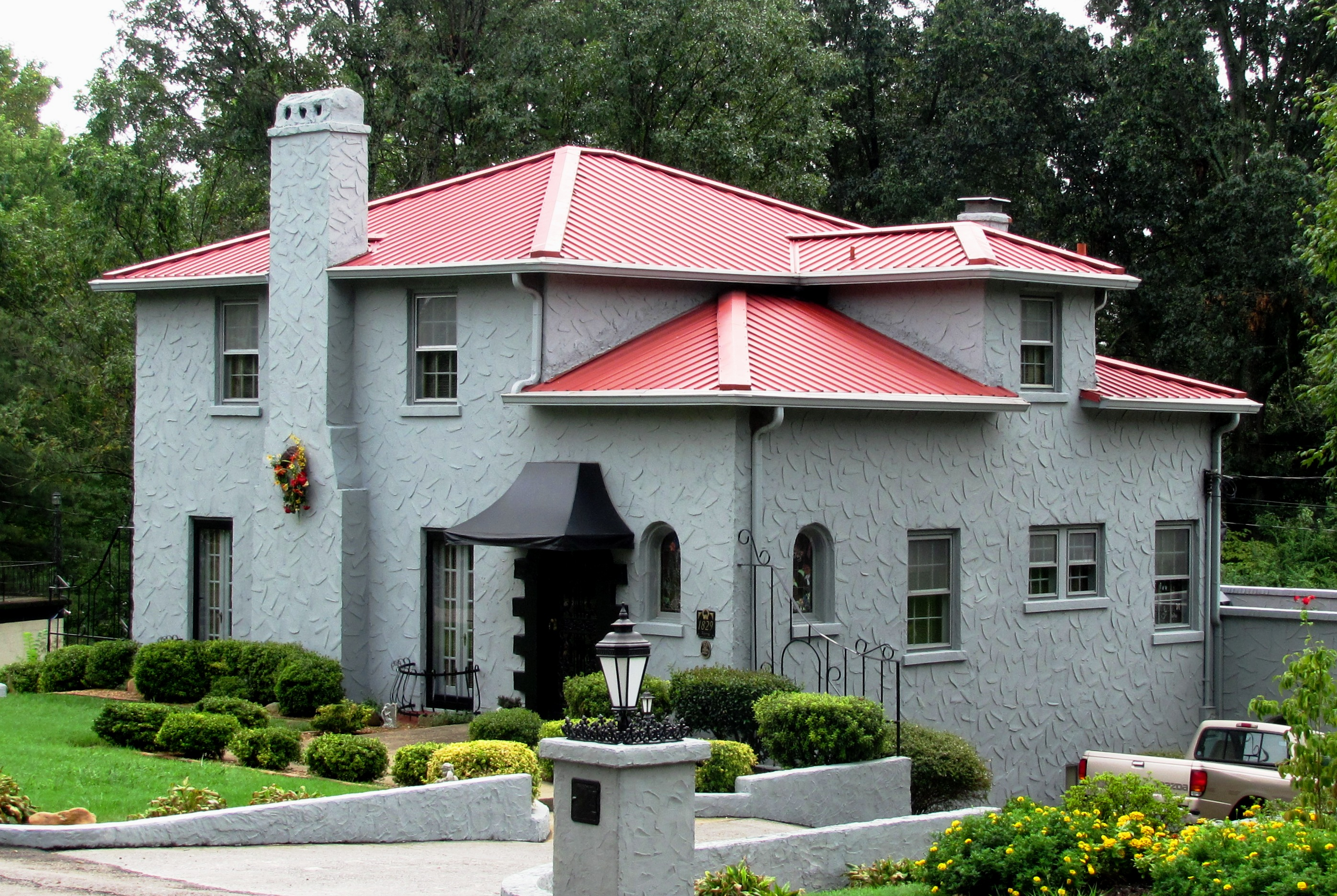
- Spanish Eclectic-style house at 1829 North Hills Boulevard

- Location within Tennessee Location within the United States
- Location: Roughly bounded by North Hills Blvd., North Park Blvd., Fountain Park Blvd., Cecil Ave. Knoxville, Tennessee
- Coordinates: 36.00515°N 83.90204°W
- Area: approximately 50 acres (20 ha)
- Built: 1927–1958
- Architectural style: Colonial Revival, Tudor Revival, Spanish Colonial Revival, English Cottage Revival, Minimal Traditional, Ranch
- MPS: Knoxville and Knox County MPS
- NRHP reference No.: 08000677
- Added to NRHP: July 25, 2008

The North Hills Historic District is a residential subdivision in north Knoxville, Tennessee, United States, that was added to the National Register of Historic Places in September 2008 as a historic district. The subdivision was established in 1927 by the North Hills Corporation as a neighborhood of custom-built homes, catering to middle-class families. The historic district includes 130 houses on about 50 acres (20 ha). At the time of its listing on the National Register, it was described by the Tennessee Historical Commission as a good example of mid-20th century residential architecture.

== Location ==
The North Hills Historic District is located about two miles northeast of downtown Knoxville. Interstate 40 passes just south of the district, and Broadway (U.S. Route 441) passes just to the west. Washington Pike divides the district from the Whittle Springs area to the north. Contributing properties in the district are found along Abbey Road, Fountain Park Boulevard, Kenilworth Lane, Kennington Road, North Hills Boulevard, North Park Boulevard.

The "entrance" to North Hills is located at the intersection of Washington Pike and North Hills Boulevard. On each side of the entrance, there are stone gateposts with marble plaques reading "North Hills." North Hills Boulevard, North Park Boulevard, and Fountain Park Boulevard are true boulevards, with grassy medians dividing the right and left lanes.

== History ==
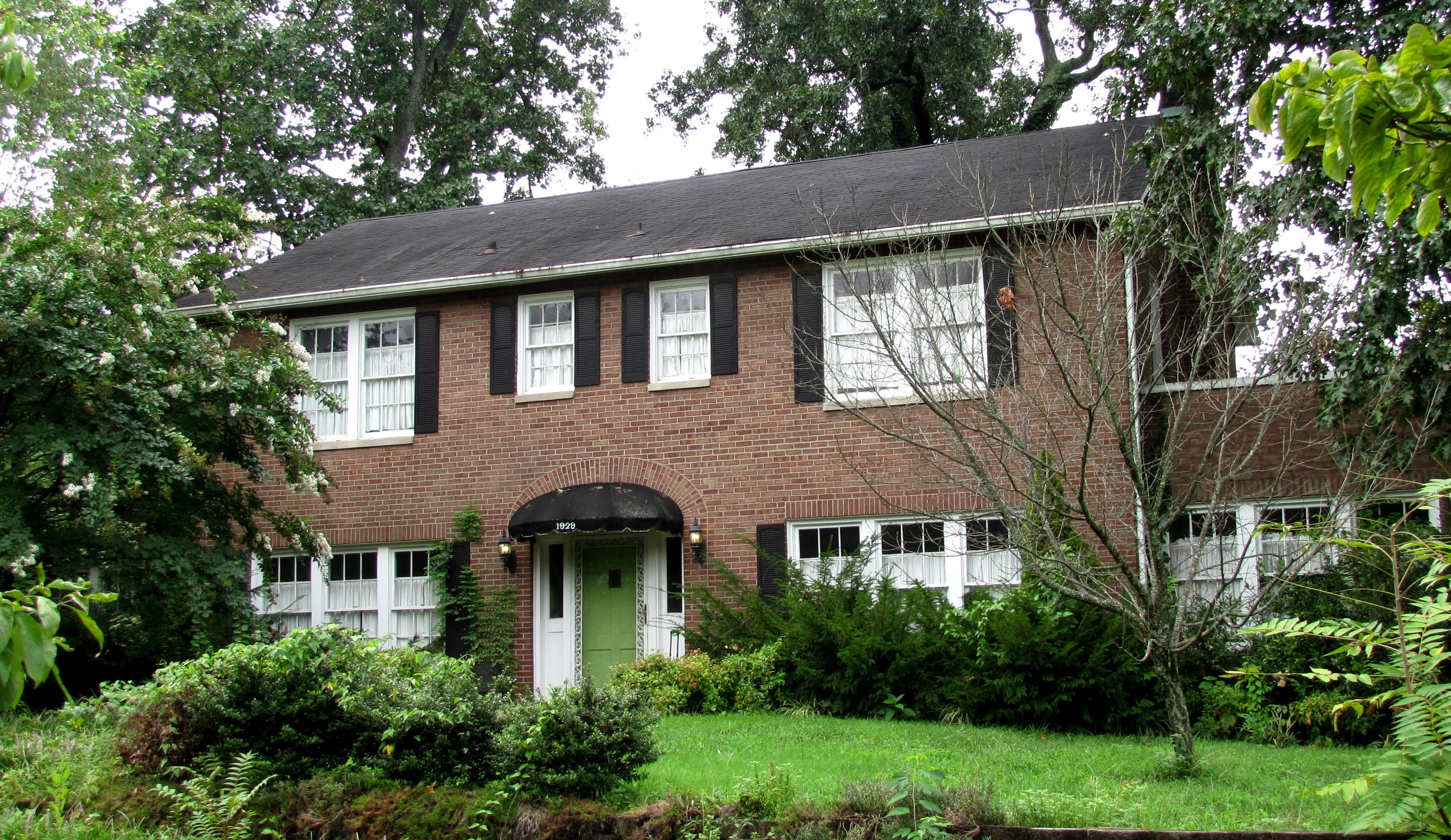
House at 1929 North Hills Boulevard, the neighborhood's oldest house

With the advent of the automobile in the 1920s, many middle-class and affluent Knoxvillians began moving from the city's urban neighborhoods to automobile-oriented neighborhoods on the city's periphery. It was during this period that developer George Fieldan and his brothers, Hugh and Carl, founded the North Hills Corporation with the intent of establishing such a neighborhood. In 1927, the Fieldans purchased 43 acres (17 ha) encompassing what is now North Hills Boulevard, Fountain Park Boulevard, and Kenilworth Lane, and began laying off lots. The first house, 1929 North Hills Boulevard, was erected that same year.

In 1928, the North Hills Corporation enacted several measures to ensure North Hills would remain an exclusive neighborhood. These included restrictive covenants that limited the neighborhood to residential use, set a minimum house size of six rooms and minimum home construction cost of US$5,000 (in 1928), specified allowable exterior and roofing materials, mandated design approval by the North Hills Corporation, and banned sales "outside of the Caucasian race." As an automobile-oriented neighborhood, North Hills was too far (almost two miles) from the nearest streetcar line to be attractive for people who depended on public transportation.

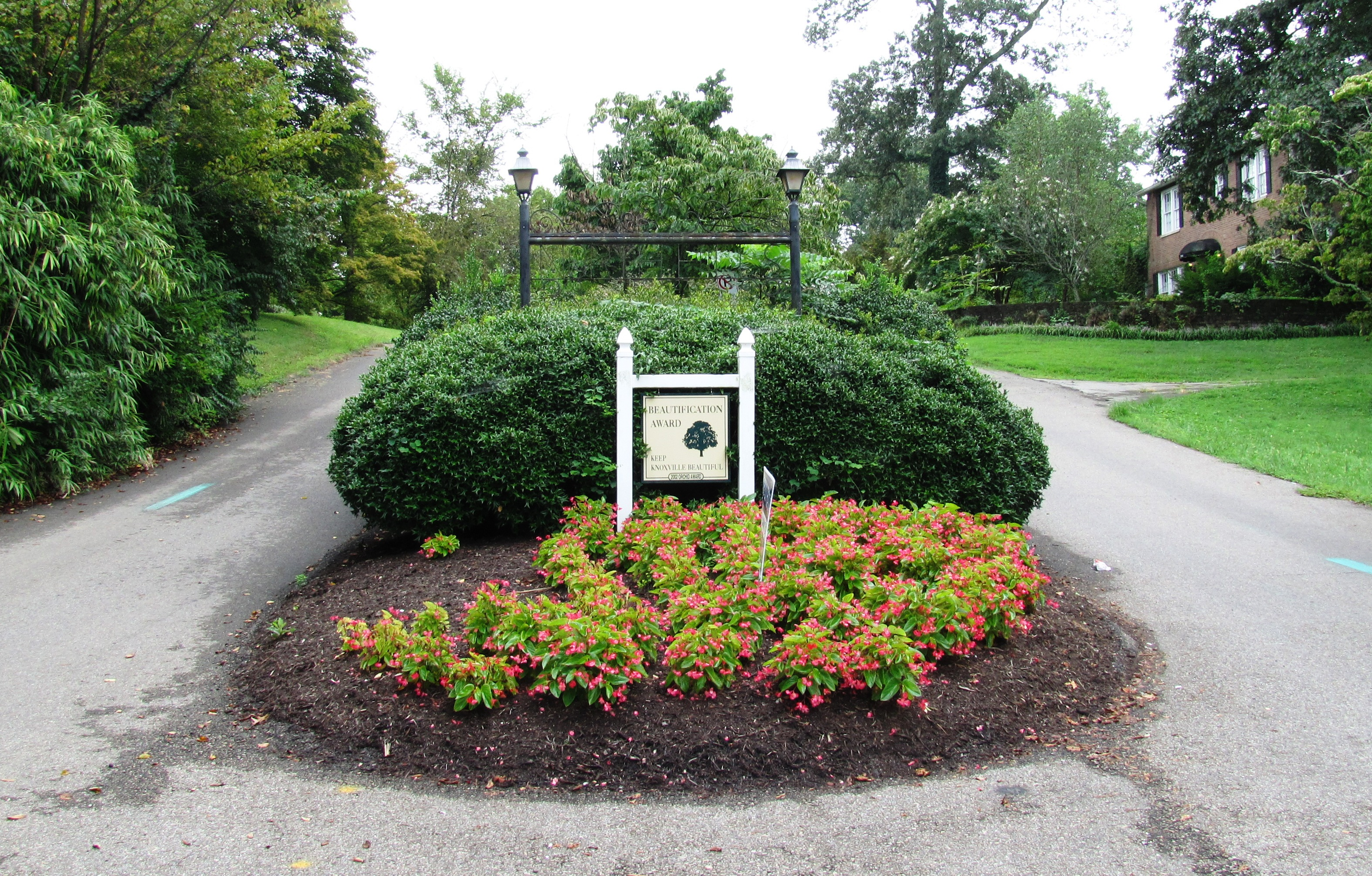
Entrance to North Hills at the intersection of North Hills Boulevard and Washington Pike

By 1933, seventy-five houses had been built in North Hills, and 175 lots remained available. Along with the Fieldans themselves, early residents included doctors, attorneys, University of Tennessee professors, executives of local companies, and Southern Railway employees. The establishment of the Tennessee Valley Authority in 1933 helped the neighborhood continue to develop during the Great Depression, as a number of new lots were sold to TVA employees.

The Fieldan brothers managed the North Hills Corporation into the 1950s, and the North Hills subdivision continued to expand during this period. The neighborhood's mix of architectural styles is typical for the mid-20th century. For the earliest houses in North Hills (i.e., late 1920s), the most common styles were Tudor Revival, Colonial Revival, and Spanish Colonial Revival. During the 1930s, the most commons styles were English Cottage Revival and Minimal Traditional, with the latter remaining common throughout the 1940s. Ranch-style houses were common among new houses built North Hills during the 1950s.

== Notable properties ==
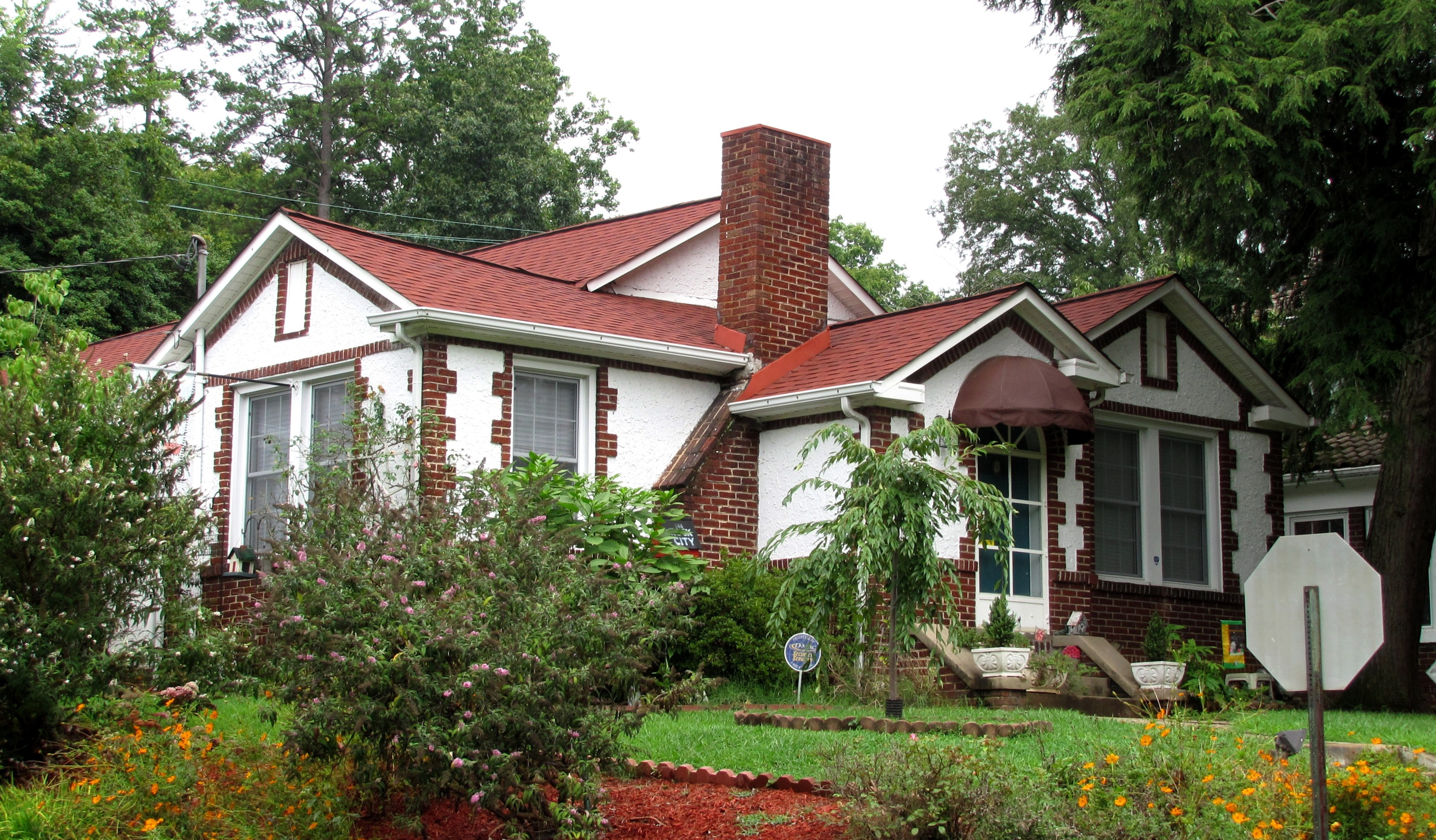
Craftsman-style house at 2903 Fountain Park Boulevard, built in 1928

The North Hills Historic District contains 130 contributing houses and 28 contributing outbuildings (garages, sheds, etc.). The district also includes several contributing sites, namely the boulevard medians, streetscapes, and North Hills Park.

- 2903 Fountain Park Boulevard, a one-story Craftsman-style house built in 1928.
- 2916 Fountain Park Boulevard, a two-story Colonial Revival-style houst built circa 1928.
- 1709 North Hills Boulevard, a one-story Minimal Traditional-style house built in 1935.
- 1714 North Hills Boulevard, a one-story Minimal Traditional-style house built in 1929.
- 1715 North Hills Boulevard, a one-story Minimal Traditional-style house built in 1929. The exterior walls of this house are covered with East Tennessee marble.

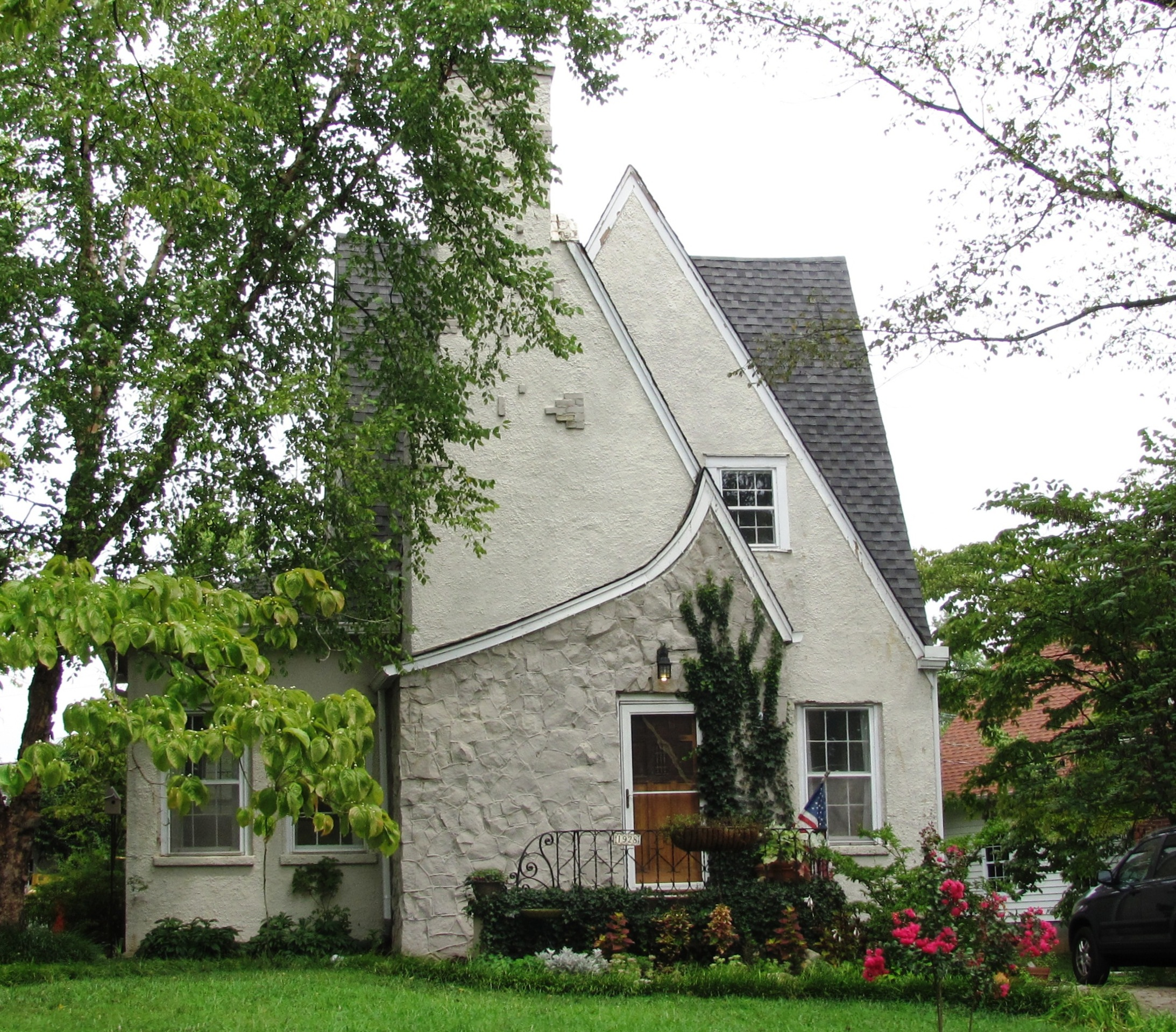
English Cottage Revival-style house at 1928 North Hills Boulevard

- 1829 North Hills Boulevard, a two-story house with a Spanish Eclectic-like design, built in 1929.
- 1905 North Hills Boulevard, a two-story Colonial Revival-style house built in 1929.
- 1906 North Hills Boulevard, a two-story Spanish Eclectic-style house built in 1929.
- 1920 North Hills Boulevard, a two-story Colonial Revival-style house built in 1929.
- 1928 North Hills Boulevard, a one-story English Cottage Revival-style house built circa 1930. The bottom half of this house's front gable is covered in uncoursed East Tennessee marble.
- 1929 North Hills Boulevard, a two-story Colonial Revival-style house. Built in 1927, this is the oldest house in the North Hills Historic District.
- 2412 North Park Boulevard, a two-story English Cottage Revival-style house built in 1928.
