= Bearden, Knoxville =

Bearden Bearden Village
- Neighborhood
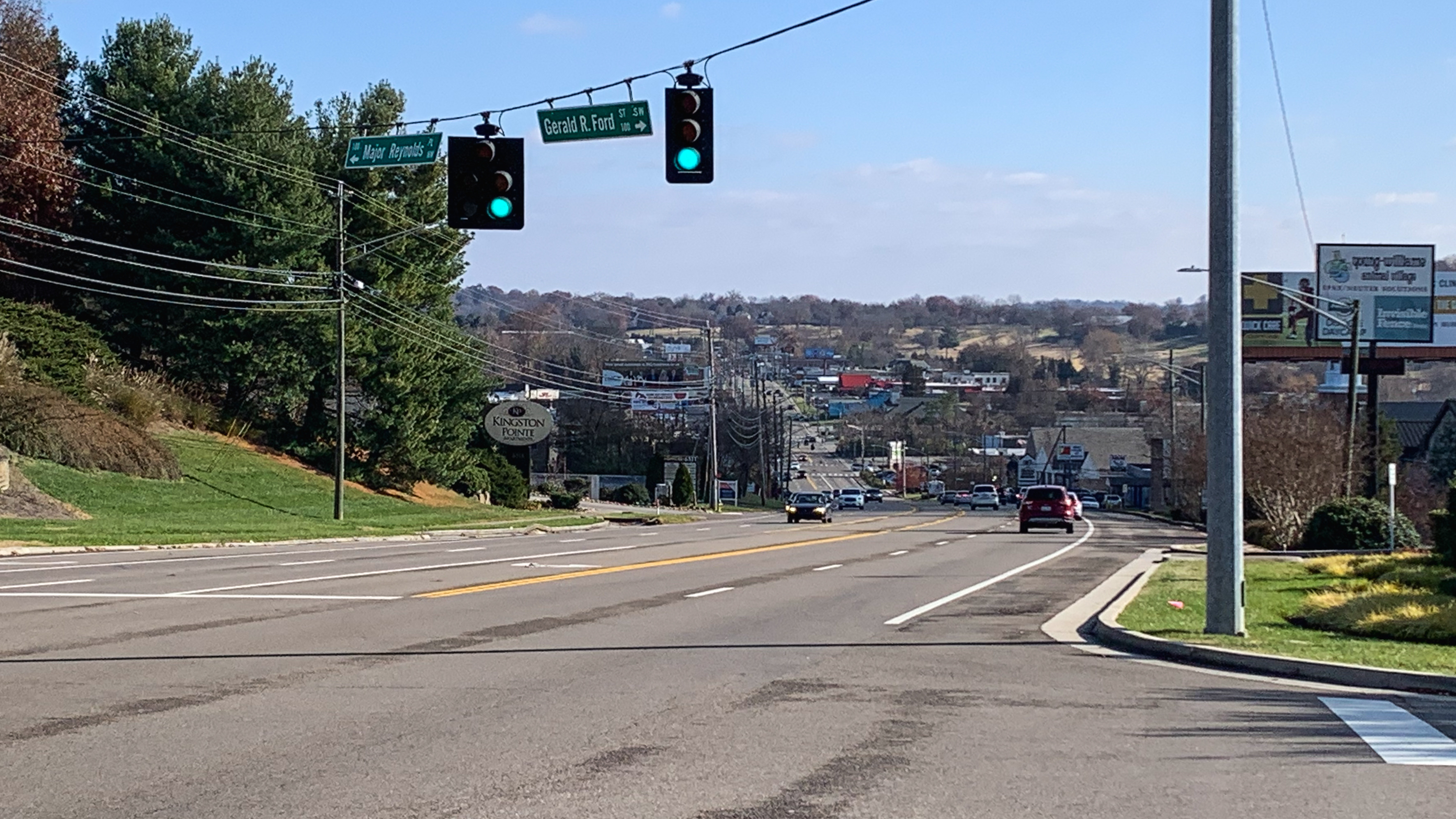
- Kingston Pike through Bearden, as seen from Bearden Hill

- Location in Tennessee and the United States Bearden (the United States)
- Coordinates: 35.93625°N 83.99177°W
- Country: United States
- State: Tennessee
- County: Knox
- City: Knoxville
- Elevation: 866 ft (264 m)
- Time zone: UTC-5 (Eastern (EST))
  - Summer (DST): UTC-4 (EDT)
- ZIP code: 37919
- Area code: 865
- GNIS feature ID: 1305023

Bearden, also known as Bearden Village, is a neighborhood in Knoxville, Tennessee, United States, located along Kingston Pike in West Knoxville. Developed primarily as an agrarian community in the 19th century, this neighborhood now lies at the heart of one of Knoxville's major commercial corridors. Named for former Knoxville mayor and Tennessee state legislator, Marcus De Lafayette Bearden (1830–1885), the community was annexed by Knoxville in 1962.

== Location ==
Bearden lies along Kingston Pike (U.S. Route 70 and U.S. Route 11) and adjacent roads, approximately 5 miles (8.0 km) west of Knoxville's downtown area. It traditionally encompasses the Kingston Pike corridor between Lyons View Pike on the east and Sutherland Avenue on the west, though the term "Bearden" can loosely refer to the entire Kingston Pike area between Sequoyah Hills and Turkey Creek. The West Hills neighborhood lies northwest of Bearden, Forest Heights lies opposite Sutherland to the north, and Ebenezer Mill lies to the southwest.

== History ==
=== Early history ===
What is now Bearden began as a small community that developed around a fortified house, which was probably located somewhere near the modern junction of Kingston Pike and Northshore Drive. This community was initially known as "Erin," presumably after the large number of Irish settlers that inhabited the area. In 1792, Knoxville surveyor Charles McClung surveyed the "Kingston Road"—the forerunner of the modern Kingston Pike—which was built to connect Knoxville with Campbell's Station (modern Farragut). This brought increased settlement to western Knox County.

During the late-18th century, the Bearden area was one of the more hostile areas in Knox County. The area's earliest settler, James Miller, was allegedly murdered shortly after his arrival in the early 1790s. In September 1793, near the end of the Cherokee–American wars, a large Chickamauga Cherokee and Creek contingent attacked and destroyed Cavet's Station, which stood near Bearden, and massacred 12 of the station's 13 inhabitants. Even after Native American hostilities had ceased, the Bearden area remained a dangerous place. In the early 1800s, the stretch of the Kingston Road west of Bearden had been nicknamed "Murderers' Hollow."

=== 19th century ===
Early businesses in the Bearden area catered to travellers along the Kingston Road, and included early 19th-century inns operated by Thomas Hudiburgh and John Gamble. In 1838, Knoxville businessmen Marcus De Lafayette Bearden (1799–1854) and Gideon Hazen established a paper mill along Third Creek in the Middlebrook area. This mill, the namesake of Papermill Drive, operated until 1886, when its milldam failed.

In 1817, an Irish immigrant named John Reynolds purchased what is now Bearden Hill from Knoxville founder James White. Reynolds's son, Major Robert Reynolds, inherited the property and built a house, Knollwood, that still stands atop the hill, overlooking Kingston Pike (his sister oversaw its construction, as he was away fighting in the Mexican–American War at the time). During the Civil War, Knollwood served as the headquarters of Confederate general James Longstreet while he planned his assault on Knoxville.

Bearden's namesake, Marcus De Lafayette Bearden (1830–1885), was a Union officer, Mayor of Knoxville, and state legislator who owned a farm in the community along Weisbarger Road. He was a cousin of the older Bearden (the paper mill founder). In 1888, while serving in the state legislature, he managed to secure funding for the Eastern State Hospital (later known as Lakeshore Mental Health Institute) on Lyons View Pike, which provided a major economic boost to the community.

=== Commercial development ===
In 1900, Bearden remained a largely rural community concentrated around a railroad depot, a post office, a gristmill, and two stores. Within a few years, more businesses began to appear, due mainly to Kingston Pike's location along two cross-country tourism routes, the Dixie Highway and the Lee Highway. In the late-1920s, Knoxville's first motel, Edd's Tourist Camp, opened in Bearden. In subsequent years, dozens of filling stations, motels and restaurants sprang up catering to the Dixie-Lee Highway tourist traffic.

While the completion of the Interstate Highway System in the 1960s drew away most of Kingston Pike's cross-country traffic, the construction of Western Plaza (Knoxville's first shopping center outside of the downtown area) in 1957 and West Town Mall in the early 1970s sparked a retail boom in West Knoxville. Numerous shopping centers and retail outlets sprang up in the 1970s and 1980s, and Knoxville's primary commercial corridor shifted from Downtown Knoxville to West Knoxville.

== Economy ==
The Bearden area is home to over 30 shopping centers, covering over three million square feet of floor space. Along with West Town Mall, major centers include Homberg Place, Bearden Center, Knox Plaza, Papermill Plaza, and the Centre at Deane Hill. Most of these shopping centers have one or two large anchor stores flanked by various smaller stores. The Bearden area is also home to several dozen office buildings with over 1,500,000 square feet (140,000 m^{2}) of office space. In recent years, Knoxville and the Bearden community have taken steps to create a more pedestrian-friendly "village" atmosphere, mainly through the construction of greenways and sidewalks, and the revision of zoning laws to allow a mix of residential, commercial, and office uses.

== See also ==
- Bearden High School
