= Westwood (Knoxville, Tennessee) =

Historic house in Tennessee, United States

- U.S. National Register of Historic Places
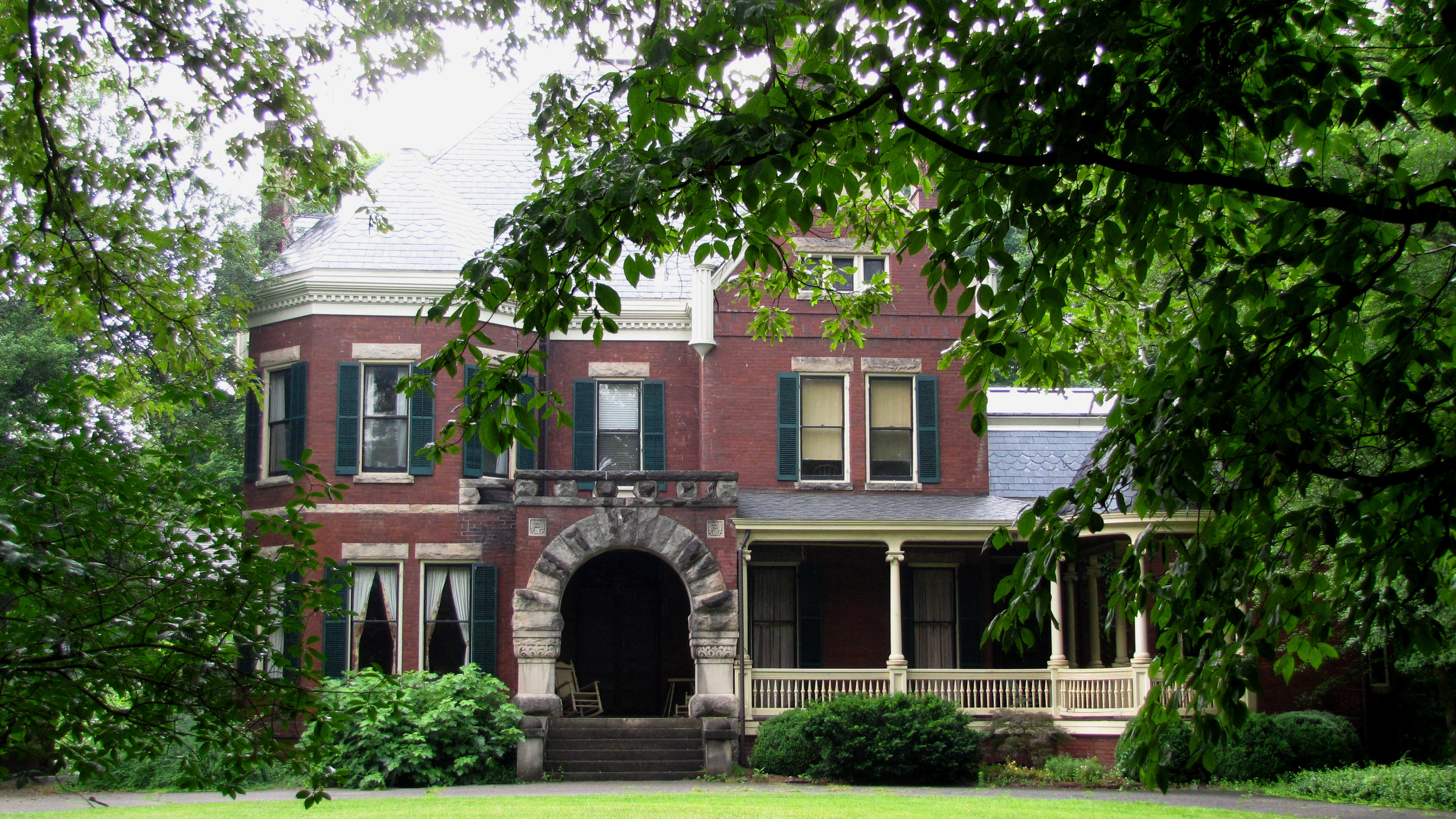
- Location: 3425 Kingston Pike, Knoxville, Tennessee
- Coordinates: 35°56′55″N 83°56′58″W
- Area: 1.4 acres (0.57 ha)
- Built: 1890
- Architect: Baumann Brothers
- Architectural style: Queen Anne, Romanesque
- NRHP reference No.: 84000366
- Added to NRHP: November 8, 1984

Westwood is a historic home located at 3425 Kingston Pike at the edge of the Sequoyah Hills area of Knoxville, Tennessee. Also known as the Adelia Armstrong Lutz House, the house was built in 1890 by John Lutz and his wife, artist Adelia Armstrong Lutz, on land given to them by Adelia's father, Robert H. Armstrong. In 1984, the house was listed on the National Register of Historic Places for its architecture.

The house stands on land that was once part of the large estate established by early Knoxville resident Drury P. Armstrong (1799–1856). Armstrong built Crescent Bend, which still stands nearby, in 1834. Robert H. Armstrong, a son of Drury, inherited a portion of his father's estate. The Bleak House, built in 1858, also still stands a few blocks from Westwood on Kingston Pike.

Westwood was designed in the Queen Anne style by the local architectural firm of Baumann Brothers. Unlike most Queen Anne houses extant in Knoxville, the house was executed in brick and stone, incorporating some Richardsonian Romanesque elements. The 5,000-square-foot (460 m^{2}), 10-bedroom house has 10 fireplaces with custom mantels and decorative tiles. The front parlor features a hand-painted ceiling.

Adelia Armstrong Lutz was an accomplished painter who had studied at the Corcoran in Washington, D.C., the Pennsylvania Academy of Fine Arts, and in Europe. She maintained an art studio in the house, in an unusual long room on the eastern side of the house that has a high ceiling, tall louvered windows, and skylights. Its hardwood floors are laid with alternating types of wood, creating a striped effect, and the walls are painted red.

Westwood remained in the Lutz family until 2009, when the Lutzes' granddaughter died. In 2012, the house was purchased by the Aslan Foundation, which planned to restore the house and transfer it to the local historic preservation organization, Knox Heritage, for its offices. Restoration plans included removing a garage and a recreation room that was added in the 20th century, repainting in the style of the period, and updating the plumbing, HVAC, and electrical systems.
