= West Knoxville =

Neighborhood of Knoxville, Tennessee

Coordinates: 35.93170°N 84.00322°W

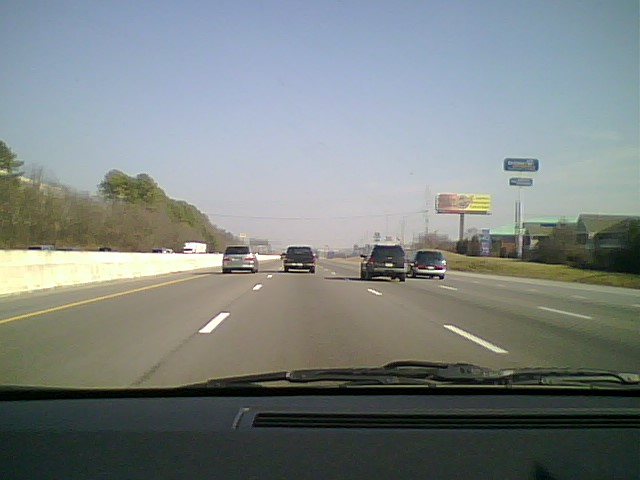
The overlapping section of I-40 and I-75 in West Knoxville

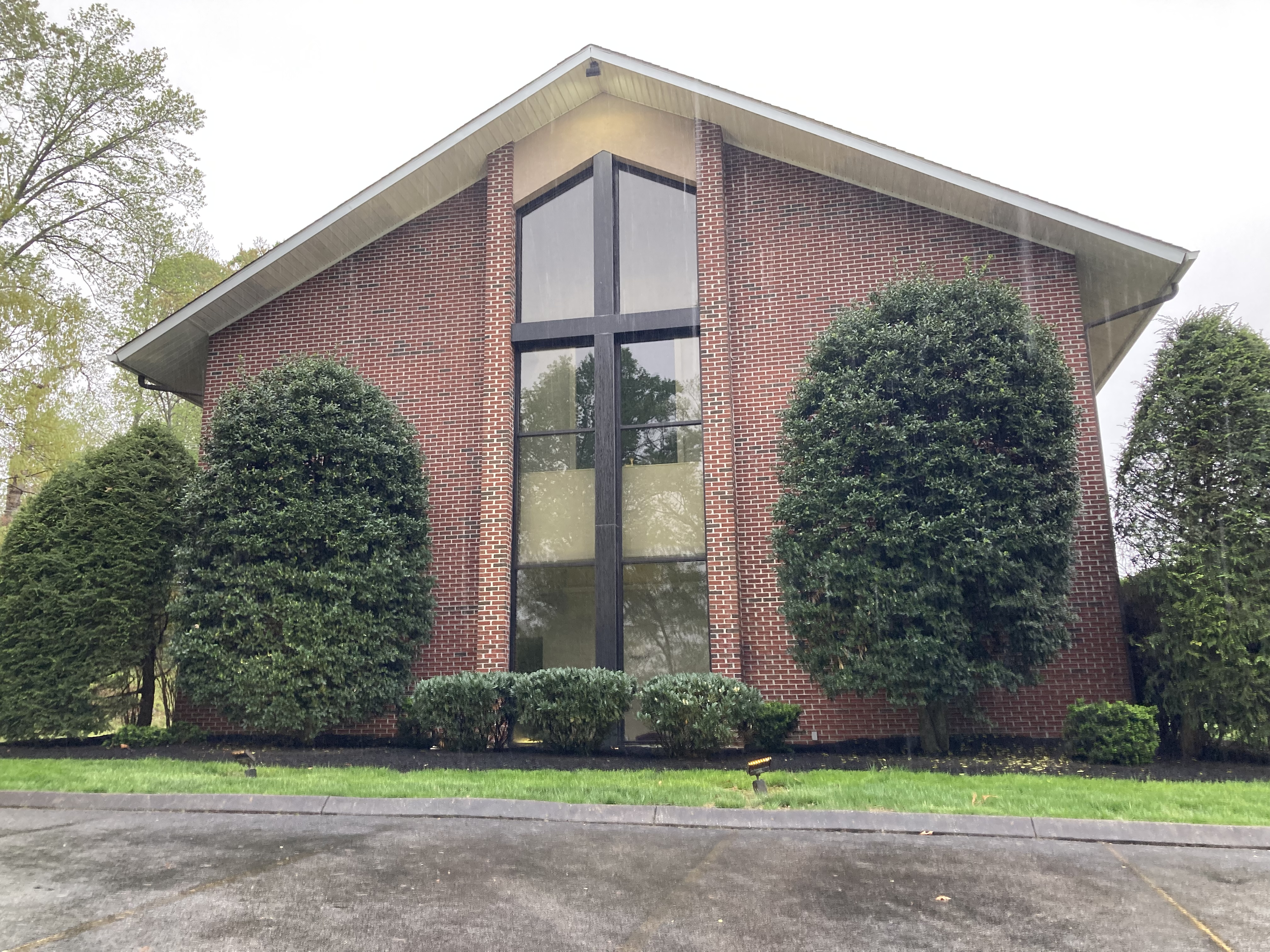
Apostles Anglican Church (ACNA) in West Knoxville

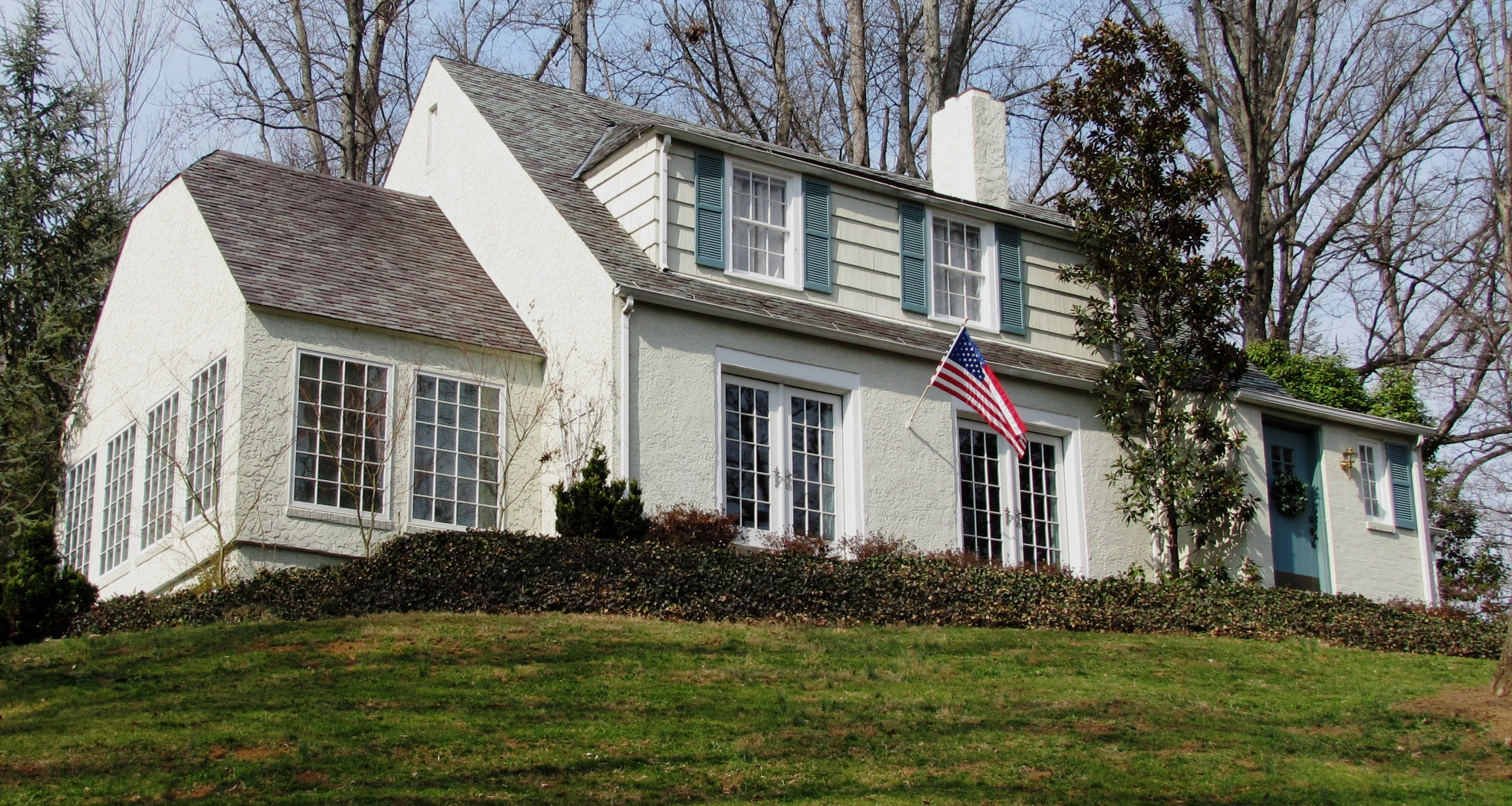
The Wayland House (1936), a contributing property to the Forest Hills Boulevard Historic District in West Knoxville

West Knoxville is a section of Knoxville, Tennessee, US. It is west of the city's downtown area. It stretches from Sequoyah Hills on the east to the city's border with Farragut on the west. West Knoxville is concentrated around Kingston Pike (US-70/US-11), and along with Sequoyah Hills includes the neighborhoods of Lyons View, Forest Heights, Bearden, West Hills, Westmoreland Heights, Cedar Bluff, and Ebenezer.

"West Knoxville" originally referred to the area immediately west of Second Creek, i.e., what is now Fort Sanders and the University of Tennessee (UT) campus, which were incorporated as the City of West Knoxville in 1888. This city was annexed by Knoxville in 1897, and Fort Sanders and UT are now part of downtown Knoxville. Continued improvements along Kingston Pike, namely the paving of the road to the county line in 1892 and the laying of trolley tracks to Lyon's View Pike in 1913, encouraged westward expansion. Sequoyah Hills and Lyon's View Pike were annexed in 1917, and Bearden and West Hills were annexed in 1962.

West Knoxville's first economic boom came in the 1920s and 1930s, when Kingston Pike was part of a merged section of two popular cross-country tourist routes, the Dixie Highway and the Lee Highway. In recent decades, the construction of dozens of shopping plazas in West Knoxville, beginning with Western Plaza in 1957, and the completion of West Town Mall in 1972, caused Knoxville's primary retail corridor to shift from downtown Knoxville to Kingston Pike, where it remains. West Knoxville's most recent major shopping complex, the 358-acre (145 ha) Turkey Creek, opened in 2002.

Throughout the 20th century, West Knoxville was settled by affluent Knoxvillians and newcomers to the Knoxville area, many of whom held more liberal political views than residents in other parts of the city. The annexation of large parts of West Knoxville in 1962 brought into the city large numbers of voters who helped elect one of Knoxville's most progressive city councils in decades in 1964. West Knoxville is also known for aggressive neighborhood advocacy groups, such as the Kingston Pike Sequoyah Hills Association and the West Hills Community Association.

== Notable people ==
- Betsy Henderson, school board chairwoman and mayoral candidate

== See also ==
- Concord
- Dixie Lee Junction
- Solway
