= Cedar Bluff, Knoxville =

Cedar Bluff, Tennessee
- Neighborhood of Knoxville
- Cedar Bluff
- Location in Tennessee and the United States Cedar Bluff (the United States)
- Coordinates: 35.9264691°N 84.0943573°W
- Country: United States
- State: Tennessee
- County: Knox
- City: Knoxville
- Elevation: 942 ft (287 m)
- Time zone: UTC-5 (Eastern (EST))
  - Summer (DST): UTC-4 (EDT)
- ZIP code: 37923
- Area code: 865
- GNIS feature ID: 1279997

Cedar Bluff is a neighborhood in Knoxville, Tennessee, United States. It located along Cedar Bluff Road north of I-40 in West Knoxville. The neighborhood lies at the heart of one of Knoxville's major commercial corridors, and is the site of a regional headquarters for Discovery, Inc.

== Geography ==
Cedar Bluff is located west of the West Hills neighborhood, and east of Pellissippi Parkway (I-140). It is accessible by Cedar Bluff Road, Park West Boulevard, and Tennessee State Route 169 (Middlebrook Pike).

== Economy ==
Cedar Bluff is the location of many of West Knoxville's office and technology parks, due its proximity to Oak Ridge and Oak Ridge National Laboratory.

== Education ==
=== Public schools ===
Students in Cedar Bluff attend the following schools in the Knox County Schools district:

- Cedar Bluff Elementary School located in Cedar Bluff
- Cedar Bluff Middle School in Cedar Bluff
- Hardin Valley High School in Hardin Valley
