= West Hills, Knoxville =

Neighborhood in Knoxville, Tennessee

Coordinates: 35.93403°N 84.03623°W

West Hills is a neighborhood in Knoxville, Tennessee, United States, located just off Kingston Pike in West Knoxville. Initially developed in the 1950s, West Hills was Knoxville's first major post-World War II subdivision, and the first subdivision to consist primarily of modern ranch-style houses. While West Knoxville experienced a boom in commercial development in the 1970s and 1980s, West Hills has managed to retain its residential character, due in large part to its aggressive neighborhood advocacy group, the West Hills Community Association.

== Location ==
West Hills lies just off Kingston Pike, approximately 7 miles (11 km) west of Knoxville's downtown area. The merged Interstate 40 and Interstate 75 passes between West Hills and Kingston Pike, running roughly parallel with the latter. The neighborhood is roughly bounded by Papermill Road on the south, Weisgarber Road on the east, and Walker Springs Road on the west. West Town Mall dominates the south side of Kingston Pike, opposite the West Hills area. Bearden and Forest Heights lie opposite Northshore Drive to the east, and the Turkey Creek shopping centers lie to the southwest.

== History ==
Before the 1950s, what is now West Hills consisted of several small family farms. The 100-acre (40 ha) Will Walker farm stood at the intersection of Wesley Road and Kingston Pike, and farms owned by the Kirby and Hickey families stood west of Vanosdale Road. Vanosdale Road is named for German immigrant David Van Osdale, who lived with his wife, Abbey, and their ten children on their 160-acre (65 ha) farm in the vicinity of the present Shannondale Health Center.

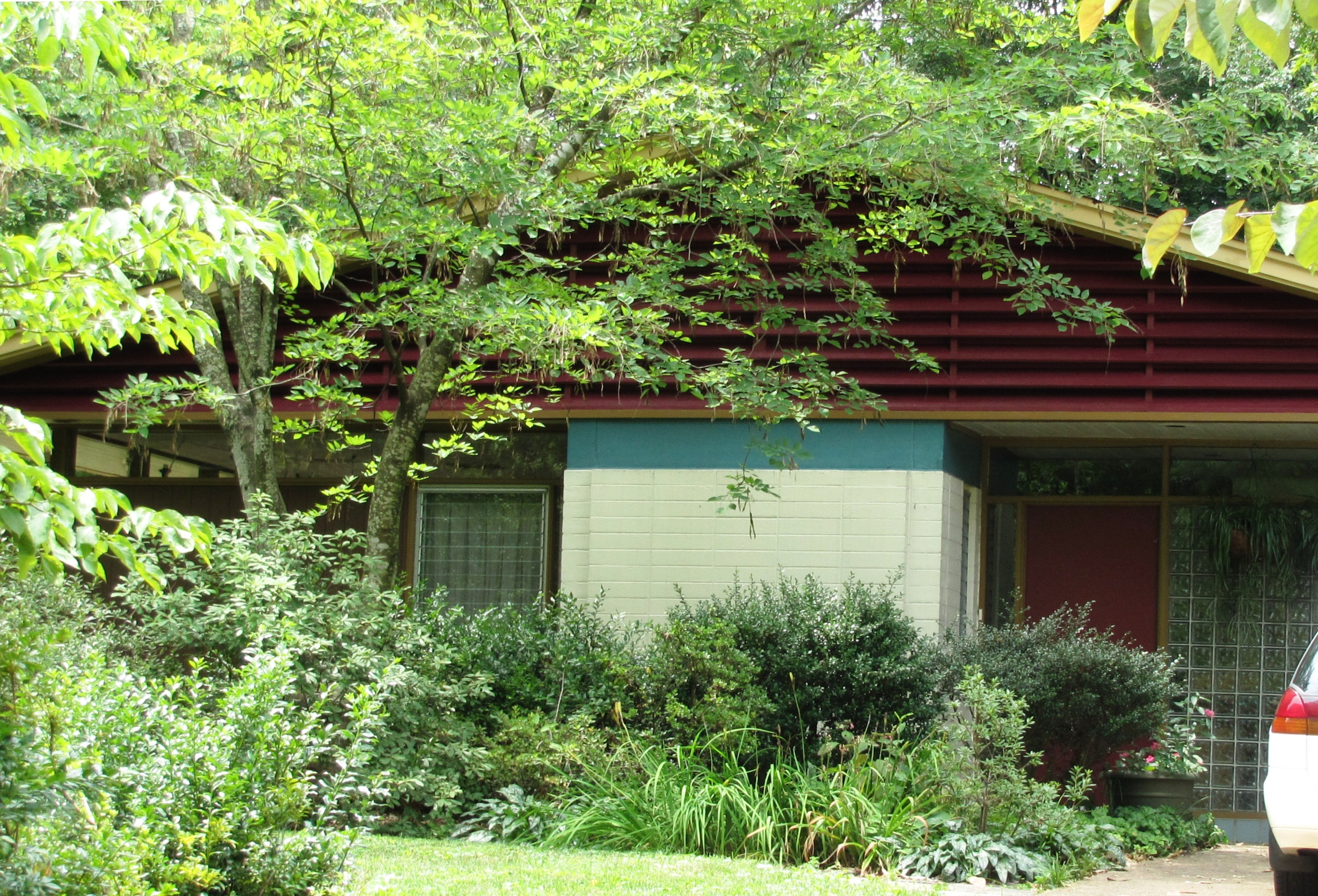
The Hotpoint Living-Conditioned House on West Hills Road

After World War II, the demand for new houses spiked, and vacant lots in Knoxville's older, pre-war neighborhoods quickly filled up. To meet the rising housing demand, developer Morgan Schubert purchased the Walker, Kirby, Hickey, and Van Osdale farms, and established the West Hills subdivision (the name "West Hills" was likely coined by Schubert). Knoxville's 1954 Parade of Homes featured new houses on Stockton Drive in West Hills, attracting many of the neighborhood's earliest residents.

One of the first houses built in West Hills was the Hotpoint Living-Conditioned House on West Hills Road. This house was one of four "demonstration starter homes" built as a result of a promotional campaign sponsored by Hotpoint Electrical Appliances and Living For Young Homemakers magazine. Conceived to demonstrate how a modern house with modern amenities could be built at an affordable price, the Hotpoint house was designed by Knoxville architect Bruce McCarty, constructed by Martin Bartling, Jr., and was surrounded by gardens designed by landscape architect Robert Zion. The house was listed on the National Register of Historic Places in 2010.

The development of shopping centers in West Knoxville in the late 1950s and 1960s brought increased threats of commercial encroachment into the West Hills neighborhood. In the early 1960s, several West Hills residents formed the West Hills Estates Civic Association— the forerunner of the West Hills Community Association— to strictly monitor development and zoning codes in the neighborhood and its vicinity. In 1972, this group worked with Knoxville's Metropolitan Planning Commission to create the West Hills Plan, which provided a development model subsequently adopted for all Knoxville neighborhoods.
