= Petro's Chili & Chips =

Fast-food chain based in East Tennessee

- Company type: Chain of restaurants
- Industry: Fast-food
- Founded: 1982
- Founder: Joe and Carol Schoentrup
- Headquarters: Knoxville, Tennessee, United States
- Key people: Dale and Keith Widmer
- Products: Corn chips topped with either meat-based or vegetarian chili

Petro's Chili & Chips is a small fast-food chain based in Knoxville, Tennessee, with several locations in Knoxville and other parts of East Tennessee.

== History ==
Petro's got its start at the 1982 World's Fair in Knoxville. Joe and Carol Schoentrup of Spokane, Washington, along with Joe's sister Ann and her husband Mark Lawrence of Kennewick, Washington operated a food concession at the fair that served a combination of chili and corn chips that they dubbed the "Petro", a name derived from "petroleum" to honor the energy theme of the 1982 World's Fair. The concept was based on a snack item that had been sold at high school sports events in Omak, Washington, wherein chili and onions were poured into open bags of Fritos, to be eaten out of the bag. In the southwestern United States, similar snacks were known as "Frito pies" or "chili pies." For the World's Fair, the Schoentrups said they "gourmetized" this combination by adding cheddar and Monterey jack cheese, tomatoes, green onions, sour cream, and hot sauce. The product was very popular, selling 175,000 units over the six months of the Knoxville fair.

The Schoentrups also sold their product at the 1984 World's Fair in New Orleans. After the two world's fairs, the Schoentrups explored franchising their concept, and eventually sold the Petro's trademark and concept to brothers Dale and Keith Widmer. They established Petro's Chili & Chips outlets in food courts in shopping malls, starting with a location in Knoxville's West Town Mall. Franchising was added in 1992.

== Products ==
Petro's primary product consists of corn chips topped with either meat-based or vegetarian chili, cheese, green onions, tomatoes, and sour cream, all served in a cup. Black olives, salsa, and Jalapeños are optional toppings. The menu also includes Premium Petro Toppings like BBQ pulled pork, grilled chicken, queso and zesty guacamole, as well as all-beef hot dogs, salads, giant baked potatoes, and fresh-baked cookies. Hint-of-Orange Iced tea served with an orange slice is Petro's signature beverage.
