= Kingston Pike =

Highway in Tennessee, U.S.

- Kingston Pike Historic District
- U.S. National Register of Historic Places
- U.S. Historic district
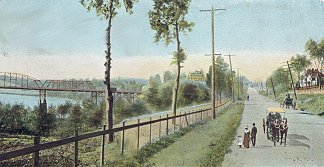
- Kingston Pike, circa 1900

- Location within Tennessee Location within the United States
- Location: Roughly 2728–3151, 3201, 3219, 3401, 3425, and 3643 Kingston Pike; Knoxville, Tennessee
- Coordinates: 35°56′58″N 83°57′18″W
- Area: approximately 61 acres (25 ha)
- Built: 1834–1930
- Architect: multiple
- Architectural style: Federal, Tudor Revival, Spanish Colonial Revival, Neoclassical
- NRHP reference No.: 96001404
- Added to NRHP: December 4, 1996

Kingston Pike is a highway in Knox County, Tennessee, United States, that connects Downtown Knoxville with West Knoxville, Farragut, and other communities in the western part of the county. The road follows a merged stretch of U.S. Route 11 (US 11) and US 70. From its initial construction in the 1790s until the development of the Interstate Highway System in the 1960s, Kingston Pike was the main traffic artery in western Knox County, and an important section of several cross-country highways. The road is now a major commercial corridor, containing hundreds of stores, restaurants, and other retail establishments.

The old Kingston road was originally surveyed and laid out in 1792 by Charles McClung which connected Knoxville to Campbell's Station, now Farragut. About 1795, the road was extended to Fort Southwest Point at what is now Kingston. During the Civil War, Confederate and Union forces fought several skirmishes along the Kingston road as they struggled for control of Knoxville. The Kingston Turnpike Company was chartered in 1866 to improve the Kingston road and by 1893 had extended the improved road to the county line. From the 1920s into the 1950s, Kingston Pike was a major stopover for tourists traveling along the Dixie and Lee highways, which intersected at Kingston Pike.

Starting with the completion of West Town Mall in 1970, Kingston Pike developed into Knoxville's largest retail corridor. Historian Jack Neely wrote, "If suburban sprawl had a local name, it would be Kingston Pike." The road is now home to "an enclosed shopping mall, a big-box mall, over 100 strip malls, 100 chain restaurants," and "more acreage of asphalt surface parking than any other street in the Knoxville MSA."

== Route ==
Kingston Pike is a five-lane road that runs westward for approximately 20 miles (32 km) from the L&N tracks just east of Alcoa Highway to the divergence of US 70 and US 11 in the Dixie Lee Junction community just across the Knox-Loudon county line. East of the L&N tracks, Kingston Pike continues into the Fort Sanders and downtown areas as Cumberland Avenue. This road continues to just west of its intersection with U.S. Route 441 (US 441, locally known as Henley Street). There, the street splits into eastbound Main Street and westbound Cumberland Avenue. US 11 and US 70 follow US 441 for several blocks before veering eastward into East Knoxville. West of Dixie Lee Junction, US 70 continues westward to Kingston, while US 11 veers southwestward to Lenoir City.

The westernmost Kingston Pike street address is the now-demolished Court Cafe building (13110) at the county line, and the easternmost is the Metron Corporation (2309). The two-block section of road between the county line and the US 70/US 11 split is typically considered Kingston Pike, although its businesses (e.g., Dixie Lee Nursery and Dixie Lee Fireworks) have "Highway 11 East" street addresses. US 70 west of Dixie Lee Junction is sometimes casually referred to as Kingston Pike or Kingston Highway, although its street addresses simply use "Highway 70 East." Before major highway construction in the 1960s, Kingston Pike followed a more winding route beyond Bearden, as evidenced by the numerous sideroads named "Old Kingston Pike." On some maps, Hines Valley Road, which intersects US 70 at Eaton Crossroads (just north of Lenoir City), is referred to as "Old Kingston Pike."

Along with US 70 and US 11, Kingston Pike is part of State Route 1 (SR 1). Kingston Pike runs roughly parallel with a merged stretch of Interstate 40 (I-40) and Interstate 75 (I-75), which passes just to the north. Along with Knoxville and Farragut, communities linked by Kingston Pike include Sequoyah Hills, West Hills, Bearden, Ebenezer Mill, and Concord.

== History ==
=== Early history ===
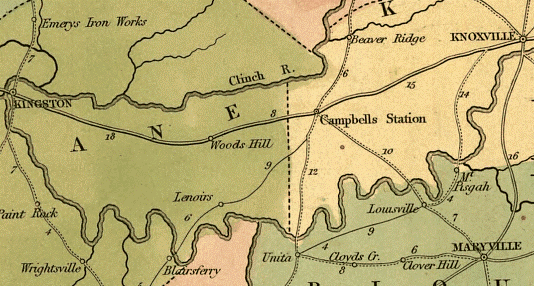
The Kingston road, as it appeared on an 1839 map of post offices in Tennessee

What is now Kingston Pike was originally part of a Native American trail. This trail ran westward to Sinking Creek (about 10 miles (16 km) west of Knoxville), where it turned abruptly southward and passed through the modern Concord area. The trail then crossed the Tennessee River and continued southward to the Overhill Cherokee towns in the Little Tennessee River valley.

By 1788, this trail had been incorporated into the North Carolina Road, the main route connecting settlements in East Tennessee with settlements in the Nashville area. In 1792, the newly created Knox County commissioned Charles McClung, a surveyor who had drawn up the original plat of Knoxville the previous year, to build a public road from Knoxville to Campbell's Station (modern Farragut). This road, originally about 30 feet (9.1 m) wide, was extended to Kingston by 1800. Several decades later, the road was widened to 50 feet (15 m) wide.

For much of its early history, the Kingston road remained a dangerous route. In 1792, the home of Ebenezer Byram (for whom the Ebenezer community is named) was attacked by a band of Creeks. The following year, a small Cherokee force attacked Cavet's Station, which stood about three miles east of the Ebenezer home, killing 12 of the station's 13 inhabitants. During the early 19th century, highwaymen stalked the more isolated stretches of the Kingston road, and by 1820 the section of the road just west of Bearden had been nicknamed "Murderers' Hollow." Starting around 1810, a stagecoach line was operated on the Kingston road until 1850, which was called the "Great Western Line" that ran between Knoxville and Nashville.

=== Civil War ===
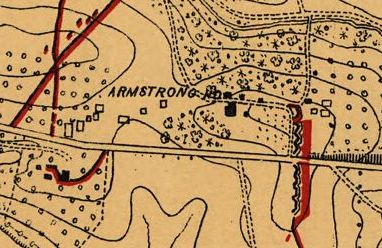
Detail of an 1864-era map showing Confederate troop formations along the Kingston road in the vicinity of the Armstrong House

In November 1863, Confederate forces under General James Longstreet marched north from Chattanooga in hopes of taking Knoxville from Union forces under General Ambrose Burnside, who had occupied the city in September 1863. Longstreet wanted to attack the city from the south, but because of fortifications in South Knoxville, he was forced to cross the Tennessee River at Huff's Ferry in Loudon and march on Knoxville from the west. To give his troops time to strengthen Knoxville's fortifications, Burnside executed a series of maneuvers to delay Longstreet's advance down the Kingston road.

On November 16, a portion of Burnside's troops engaged Longstreet's vanguard, led by General Lafayette McLaws, at the Battle of Campbell's Station. This engagement, which lasted about six hours, allowed the greater part of Burnside's forces to make their way back down the Kingston road to Knoxville. As Burnside's chief engineer Orlando Poe worked feverishly to fortify the city, Union cavalry commander William P. Sanders executed a delaying action just west of town near the Bleak House, buying Poe another 36 hours of fortification. With Knoxville fortified, Longstreet surrounded the city and settled in for a siege. He set up his headquarters at the Bleak House, and his staff set up offices at Knollwood and Crescent Bend. On November 29, after a two-week siege, Longstreet ordered McLaws to march against Fort Sanders, an earthen bastion overlooking the Kingston road from the north. The assault was beaten back, however, and Longstreet withdrew a few days later.

=== Kingston Turnpike ===
In May 1866, the Kingston Turnpike Company was chartered with the intention of improving the Kingston road to the Knox County line. The following year, Professor R. L. Kirkpatrick resurveyed the first five miles of the road, which were then macadamized by a crew led by Colonel R. F. Bibb. The road was also raised, and ditches were added to facilitate drainage. Knox County purchased the Kingston Turnpike Company in 1892 and completed the improved turnpike to the county line in late 1893.

By 1913, trolley tracks had been constructed along Kingston Pike as far west as Lyons View Pike, leading to residential development and the construction of apartment buildings along the 2000 and 3000 blocks. Kingston Pike was paved with a hard surface in the early 1920s, reflecting the rise of automobile travel. By the end of World War II, Kingston Pike had been expanded to a four-lane road.

=== Dixie Lee Highway ===
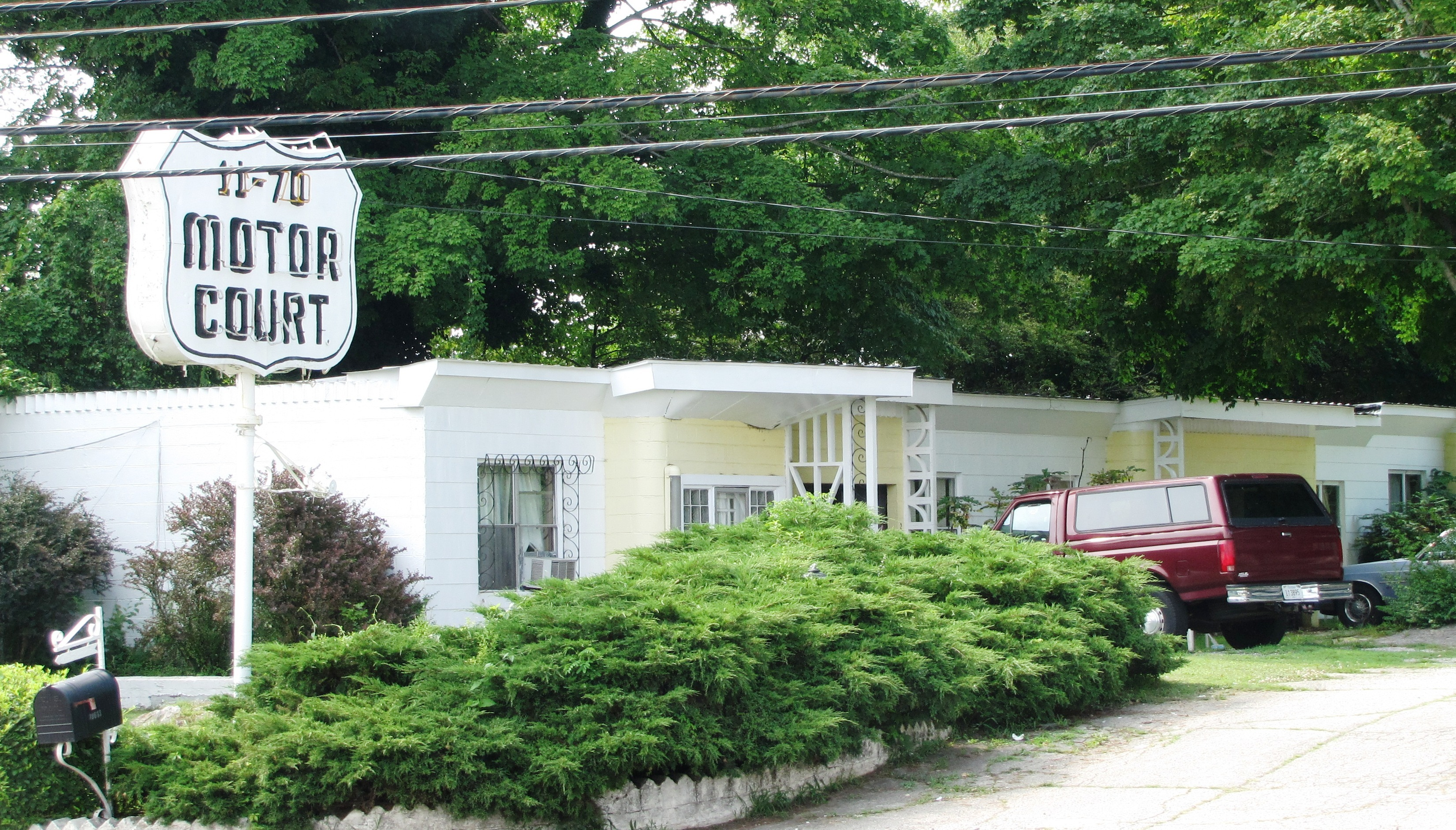
The 11-70 Motor Court, an early motel from Kingston Pike's Dixie Lee Highway period

From the 1920s until the late 1950s, Kingston Pike was known as the "Dixie Lee Highway," as it lay along a merged stretch of two cross-country auto-tourism routes—Dixie Highway (which followed US 70 through the area) and Lee Highway (which followed US 11). Dixie Highway, conceived in 1915, was a north-south route that connected cities in the Midwestern United States with beaches in the South. Lee Highway was primarily an east-west route that connected Arlington, Virginia, with California. The two routes joined in downtown Knoxville and diverged at the US 70/US 11 split at the Knox-Loudon line, which thus became known as the Dixie-Lee Junction.

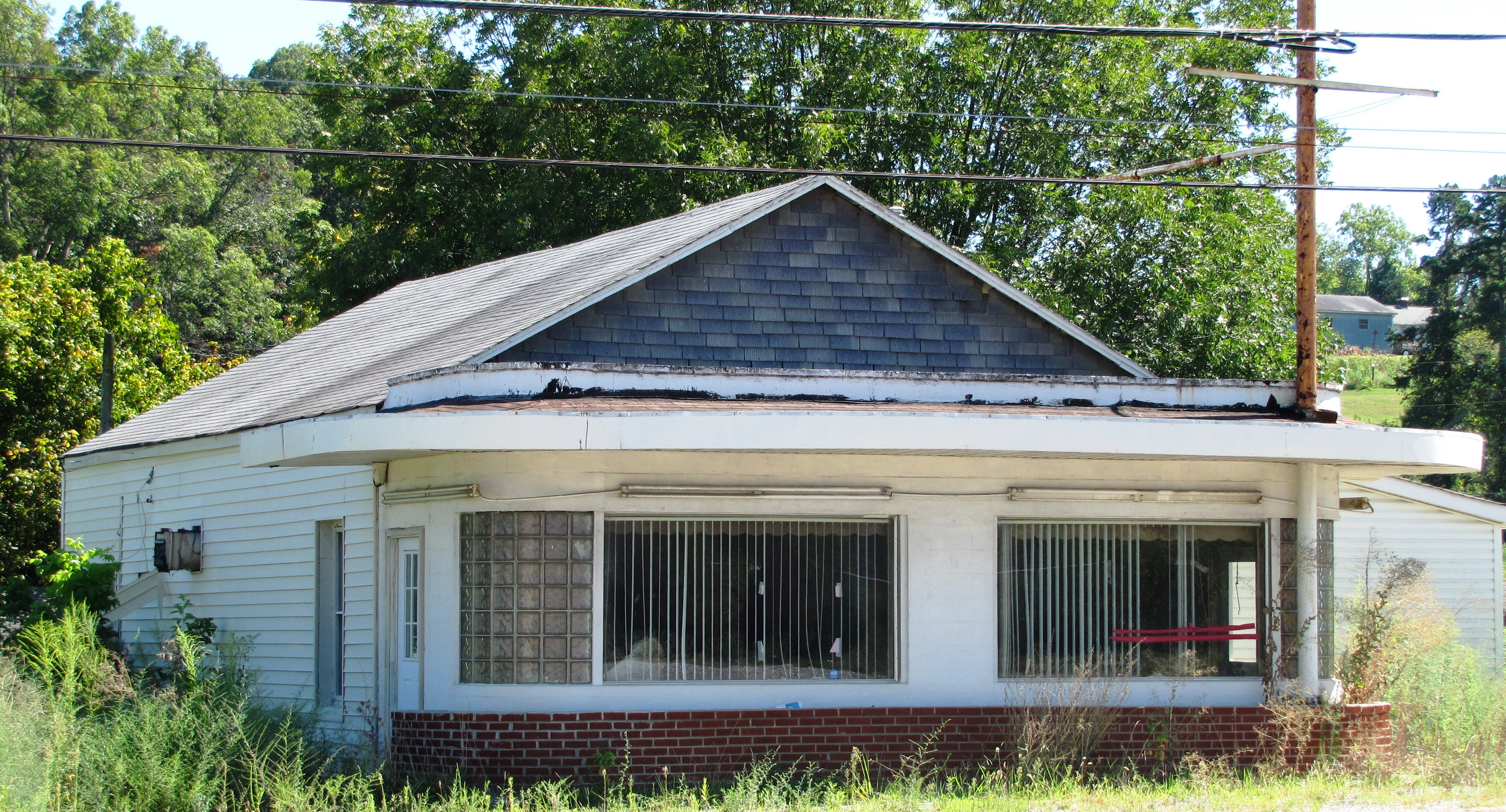
The now-demolished Court Cafe building at Dixie Lee Junction

The automobile traffic along the Dixie and Lee highways brought a tourism boom to Kingston Pike. Beginning in the 1920s, businesses catering to this thru-traffic sprang up along the length of the road from Bearden to Dixie Lee Junction. Tourist camps, predecessors to the modern motel, were among the earliest of these businesses and included Knoxville's first motel, Edd's Tourist Camp, which was established in Bearden in the late 1920s. Restaurants also began to appear, many of which used flashy signs, unusual Streamline Moderne architecture, and names such as the "White Dot Barbecue Stand," the "Oki-Doke Cafe," and the "Wonder Lunch Room" to attract passing tourists. Drive-in theaters and skating rinks began to appear along Kingston Pike during the 1950s.

The development of the Interstate Highway System in the 1950s and 1960s brought an end to the Dixie Lee Highway period. Interstate 40 (I-40) and I-75, which run roughly parallel to Kingston Pike, siphoned off most of the area's interstate traffic, and most of Kingston Pike's tourism-related businesses closed. Only a few buildings from Kingston Pike's Dixie Lee Highway period have survived to the present day, most notably the 11-70 Motor Court near Farragut and Dixie Lee Fireworks at Dixie Lee Junction.

=== Later development ===
With the advent of the automobile in the 1920s, Knoxville's more affluent residents began fleeing urban neighborhoods for suburbs on the city's periphery. One of the earliest such suburbs was Sequoyah Hills, which was established just off Kingston Pike in the 1920s. After World War II, Kingston Pike experienced an explosion in suburban development. The establishment of suburbs such as West Hills led to a 38% population increase in the Kingston Pike area during the 1950s.

In 1961, Knoxville annexed a large stretch of land along Kingston Pike west of Sequoyah Hills, bringing several unincorporated communities into the city. The opening of West Town Mall in the 1970s resulted in the collapse of retail shopping in downtown Knoxville, and Kingston Pike became Knoxville's primary commercial corridor.

== Historic district ==
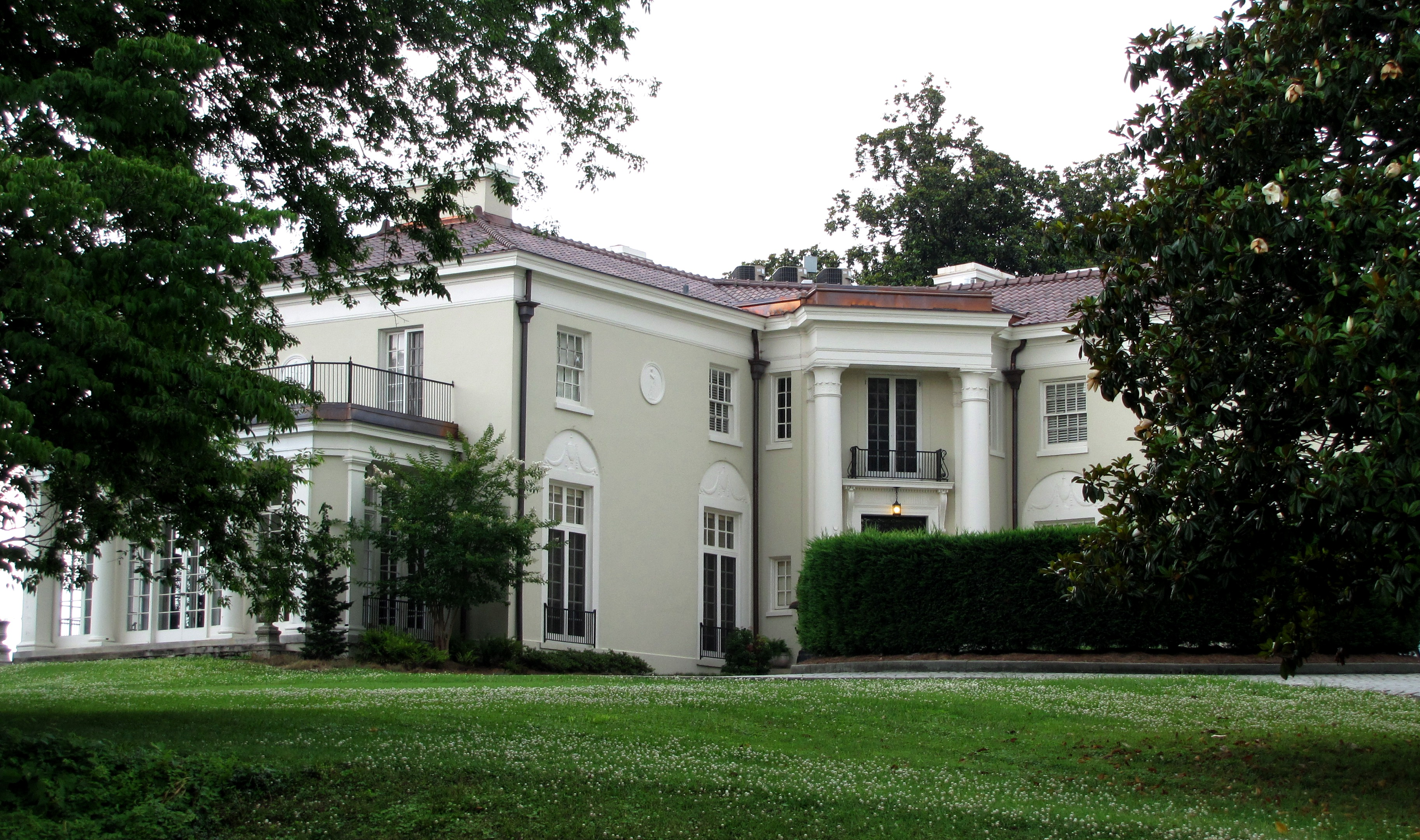
The H. L. Dulin House (3100 Kingston Pike), built in 1915

The Kingston Pike Historic District consists of two dozen houses and apartment buildings added to the National Register of Historic Places in 1996. The houses, concentrated primarily on the road's 2000 and 3000 blocks, were constructed circa 1834–1930, and are thus representative of the period before strip malls and other retail outlets came to dominate the road. Architectural styles in the district include Federal, Georgian Revival, Bungalow, Tudor Revival, Queen Anne, Neoclassical Revival, and Spanish Colonial Revival.

Several buildings located along Kingston Pike are listed individually on the National Register but are not part of the historic district. These include the Ossoli Circle Clubhouse (2511), the Tyson Junior High building (2607), the Benjamin Morton House (4084), Knollwood (6411), and the Avery Russell House (11409). The Baker Peters House (9000) was built before the Civil War but is ineligible for listing due to numerous modifications. Several other listings are located just off Kingston Pike, ranging from the 1806-era Statesview in Ebenezer to the 1954 Hotpoint Living-Conditioned Home in West Hills.

=== Notable houses ===
- Crescent Bend (2728), also called the Armstrong-Lockett House, a Federal-style brick house built by Drury Paine Armstrong in 1834.
- Van Dyke Apartments (2742), a two-story Spanish Colonial Revival-style brick apartment building constructed in 1927.
- 3024 Kingston Pike, a two-story brick Georgian Revival-style house built in 1930.
- Monday Apartments (3039), a two-story Spanish Colonial Revival-style brick apartment building constructed c.1928.

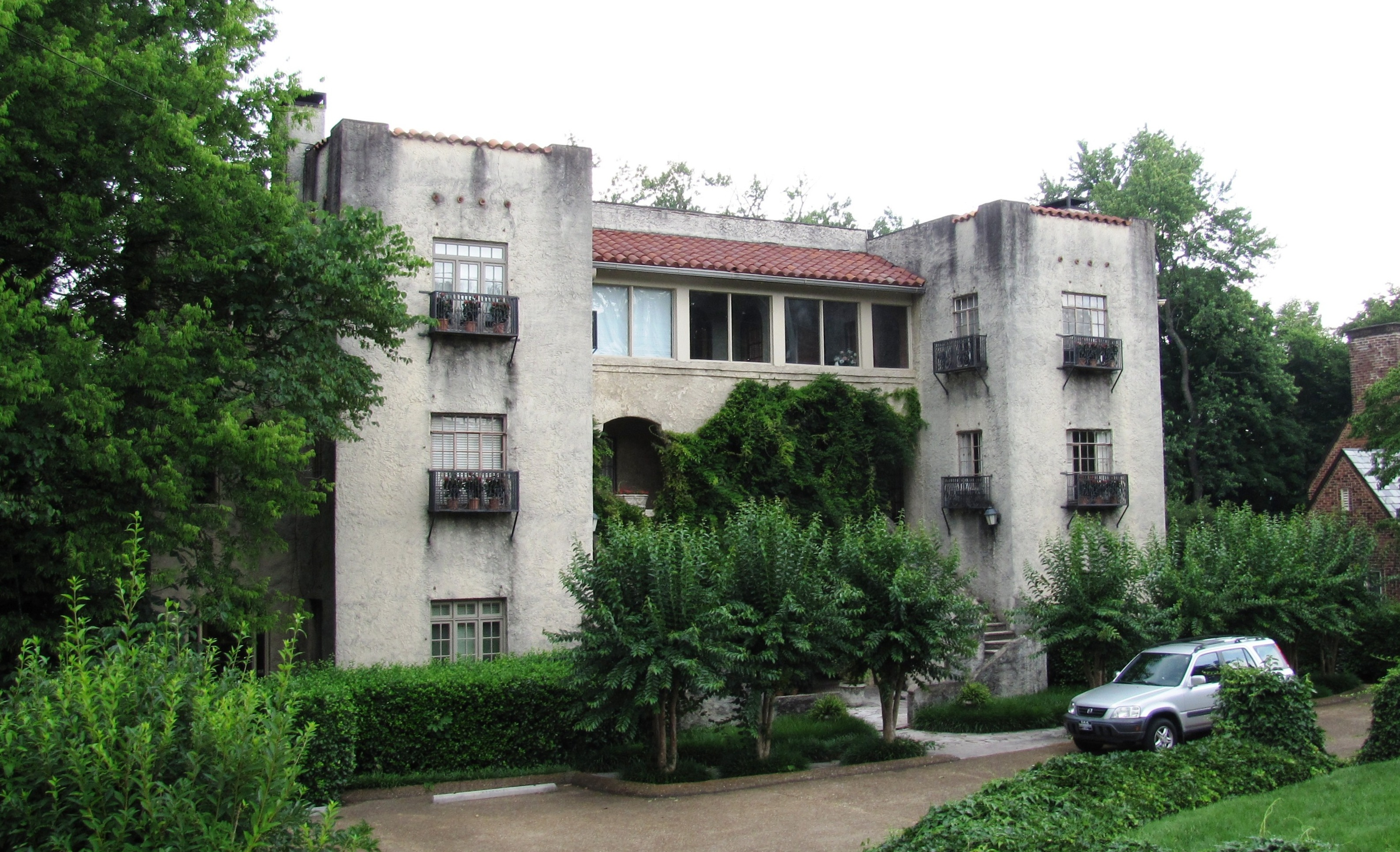
The Nicholas, a Spanish Colonial Revival-style apartment building at 3051–3065 Kingston Pike

- The Nicholas (3051–3065), a three-story Spanish Colonial Revival-style apartment building constructed c.1930.
- H. L. Dulin House (3100), also called Crescent Bluff, a two-story Neoclassical-style house constructed in 1915 and designed by architect John Russell Pope. From 1961 until 1987, this house was home to the Dulin Art Gallery, which eventually evolved into the Knoxville Museum of Art. The Dulin House was listed individually on the register in 1974.
- George Taylor House (3128), a two-story Queen Anne/Neoclassical house originally constructed in 1900, and remodeled in 1929 by Charles I. Barber of the firm Barber & McMurry.
- Bleak House (3148), also called Confederate Memorial Hall, a two-story Italianate-style house originally constructed in 1856 by Robert H. Armstrong and remodeled in 1930. This house was listed individually on the register in 1984.
- Westwood (3425), a two-story Queen Anne/Richardsonian Romanesque house built in 1890 by John E. Lutz and Adelia Armstrong Lutz and designed by the architectural firm Baumann Brothers. This house was listed individually on the register in 1984.
- Stickley House (3835), the 1925 Gustav Sickley designed (1912) craftsman home is one of the older surviving pre-suburban estates along Kingston Pike, was once home to prominent businessman, politician and philanthropist Eddie Mannis, who added the sprawling stone gardens, fountains, and plazas in the back backing up to the Third Creek bicycle trail. The plans came from the Craftsman Home Builders Club started by Stickley employed architect Harvey Ellis. Other notable residents include Cuban-born physician Rogelio Carrera, lawyer Robyn Askew and the Venerable Jerry Askew, former president of the East Tennessee Foundation.
