= Bleak House (Knoxville, Tennessee) =

Historic house in Tennessee, United States

- U.S. National Register of Historic Places
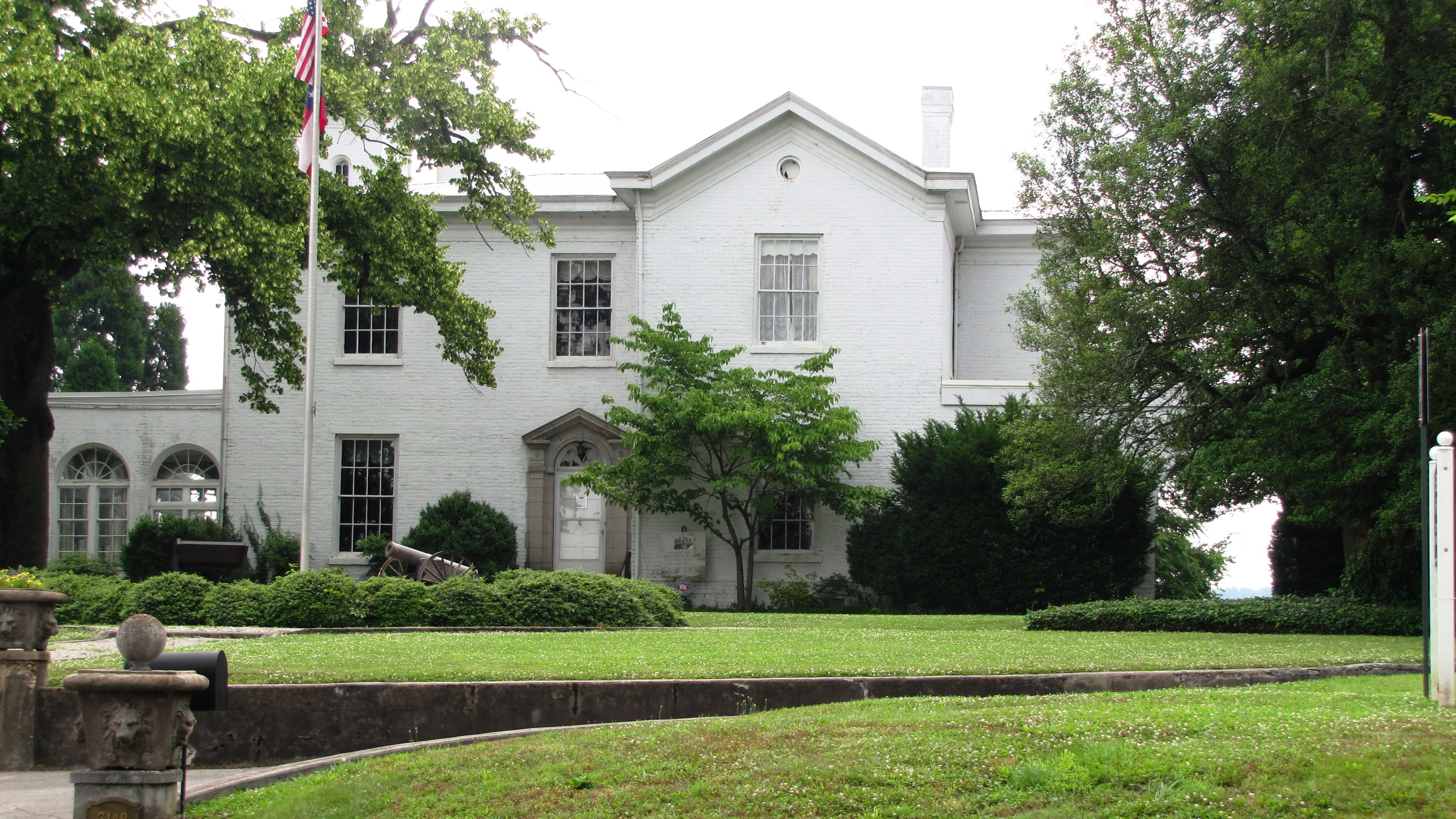

- Location within Tennessee Location within the United States
- Location: 3148 Kingston Pike; Knoxville, Tennessee
- Coordinates: 35.9500°N 83.9565°W
- Architectural style: Italianate
- NRHP reference No.: 84000369
- Added to NRHP: November 8, 1984

Bleak House is an antebellum Classical Revival style house in Knoxville, Tennessee. It is on the National Register of Historic Places.

== History ==
The house was first occupied by Robert Houston Armstrong and his wife, Louisa Franklin. It was built in 1858 for the couple as a wedding gift by the bride's father, Major Lawson D. Franklin. Robert Armstrong's father, Drury Armstrong, gave them the land. The Armstrongs named the house after Charles Dickens' "Bleak House" novel of the same name. The bricks in the house were molded on-site using slave labor.

The home was used by Confederate Generals James Longstreet and Lafayette McLaws as their headquarters from November 17 to December 4 of 1863 during the Battle of Knoxville. Three Confederate sharpshooters who were stationed in the house's tower were killed by Union cannonballs. Two of the cannonballs are still embedded in the walls, and Civil War-era sketches of the slain soldiers are displayed on the walls of the tower.

The home now belongs to local Chapter 89 of the United Daughters of the Confederacy and is commonly called Confederate Memorial Hall.

Crescent Bend, built by Robert Armstrong's father, Drury, and Westwood, built by Robert's daughter, Adelia Armstrong Lutz, still stand a few blocks from the Bleak House on Kingston Pike.
