= Adelia Armstrong Lutz =

American painter

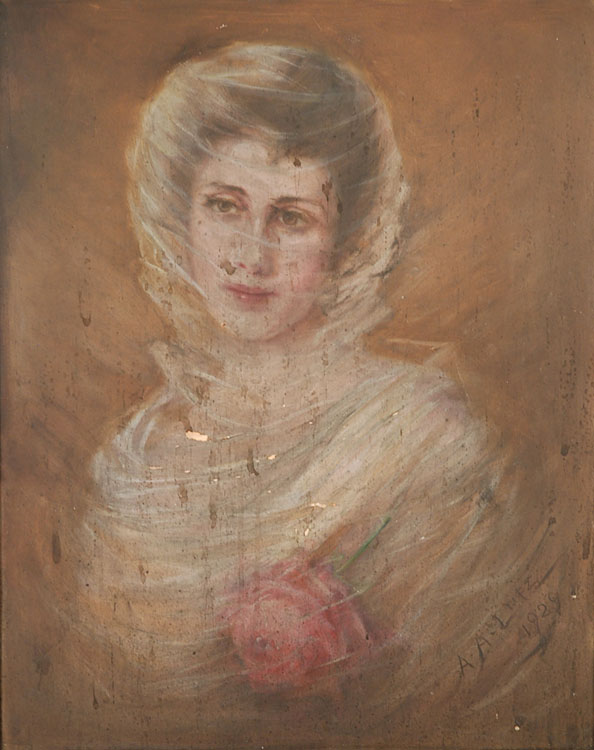
- Self-portrait
- Born: Adelia Armstrong; June 25, 1859; Jefferson County, Tennessee, United States
- Died: November 17, 1931 (aged 72); Knoxville, Tennessee
- Education: Corcoran Gallery; Pennsylvania Academy of the Fine Arts
- Known for: Painting

Adelia Armstrong Lutz (/lʌts/; June 25, 1859 – November 17, 1931) was an American artist active in the late nineteenth and early twentieth centuries. She organized art circles in Knoxville, Tennessee, as director of the Knoxville Art Club and as a co-organizer of the Nicholson Art League. Her still lifes and portraits were exhibited throughout the American South, and they are to be the subject of a permanent exhibit at her former home, Historic Westwood.

Lutz's home in Knoxville, Westwood, has been listed on the National Register of Historic Places.

== Life ==
Lutz was born Adelia Ann Armstrong at the home of her maternal grandparents in Jefferson County, Tennessee. She was the daughter of Robert and Louise (Franklin) Armstrong, and granddaughter of Drury Armstrong, an early Knoxville landowner whose house, Crescent Bend, still stands on Kingston Pike. She spent her childhood in the antebellum mansion built by her father, Bleak House. Lutz was a sister-in-law of novelist Anne W. Armstrong (1872–1958), who married Lutz's brother, Robert Franklin Armstrong, in 1905.

Lutz attended the East Tennessee Female Institute in Knoxville in the early 1870s, where she was a classmate of future Knoxville philanthropist Mary Boyce Temple. She later attended the Southern Home School in Baltimore and Augusta Seminary (Mary Baldwin College) in Staunton, Virginia. She continued her art training at the Corcoran Gallery in Washington, D.C., and the Pennsylvania Academy of the Fine Arts in Philadelphia. During this period, she toured Europe.

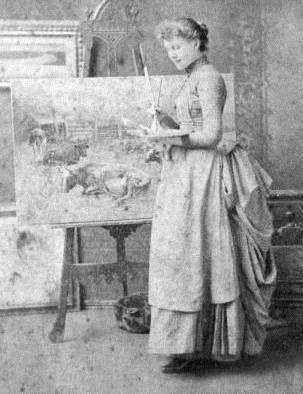
Lutz, painting in her studio, photographed by Frank B. McCrary in the late 1880s

After returning to Knoxville, Lutz taught painting out of a studio located in the Kern Building on Market Square. She married entrepreneur John Edwin Lutz (1854–1920) in a large ceremony at Knoxville's Second Presbyterian Church on February 10, 1886. Their home, Westwood, which stands on land given to Lutz by her father, was completed in 1890. The house's design incorporated a studio and gallery for Lutz, which she would often open to visitors in subsequent years. The Lutzes had two children, Louise Lutz Holloway and Edwin Rowland Lutz.

Lutz was a director of the Knoxville Art Club and an inaugural member of its successor, the Nicholson Art League. This League included among its members painters Lloyd Branson, Catherine Wiley, and Charles Krutch, photographer Joseph Knaffl, and architect George Franklin Barber. Lutz posed for one of Branson's earliest portraits in 1878, and her studio was photographed by his partner, Frank B. McCrary, in the late 1880s. Lutz's painting, "Motherless," was exhibited at the Tennessee Centennial Exposition in Nashville in 1897, and she and several other Nicholson members exhibited work at a Richmond Art Club exposition in Virginia in 1902. Lutz helped organize the art displays at the Appalachian expositions of 1910 and 1911, and she was on the Executive Board of the Art Department for the National Conservation Exposition in 1913.

Lutz continued painting until her death in 1931. She was initially buried in Knoxville's New Gray Cemetery, but was later reinterred at Highland Memorial Cemetery off Kingston Pike. Lutz's home, Westwood, was listed on the National Register of Historic Places in 1984. Her granddaughter, Cecil Holloway Matheny, resided at the house until her death in 2009 at the age of 97. Lutz's studio within the house remains much as Lutz left it, and at the time of Matheny's death still contained some of Lutz's unfinished paintings.

== Works ==
While Lutz occasionally painted portraits (especially of her children) and landscapes, her favorite subject matter was flowers, especially hollyhocks, which she also grew in her garden at Westwood. Her works were exhibited at expositions throughout the South, and occasionally won various awards. Her paintings are currently part of the collections of the Knoxville Museum of Art, the East Tennessee History Center, and the Tennessee State Museum.

Lutz did much of her work in her studio in Westwood. The studio consists of one long room resembling a cathedral, with a high ceiling and skylights. The walls are painted in Lutz's preferred color of red. The studio's fireplace contains tiles painted with the portraits of Lutz's favorite authors.

== Gallery ==
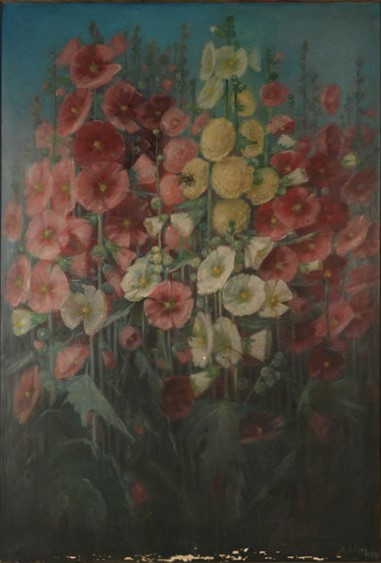
Still-life of Hollyhocks

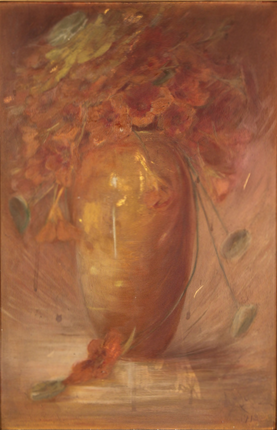
Still-life

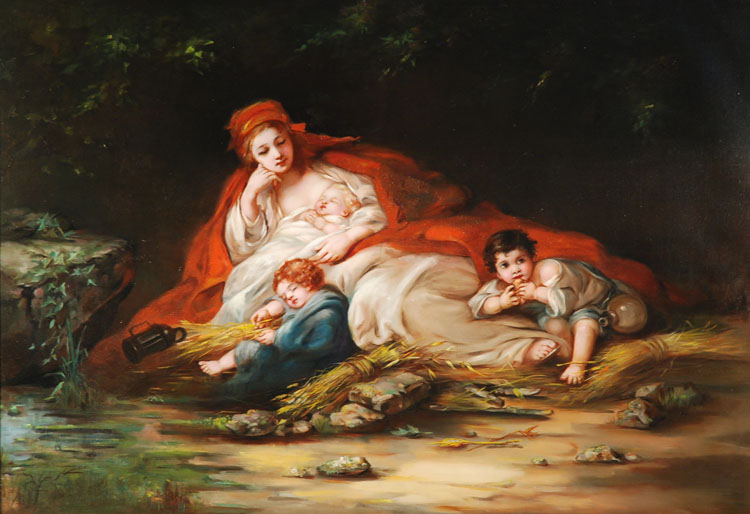
Rest

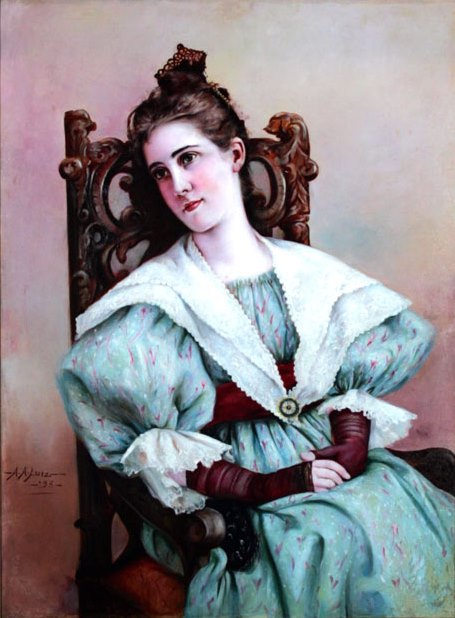
Mary Kirkland, wife of
James Kirkland
