= Anne W. Armstrong =

American writer

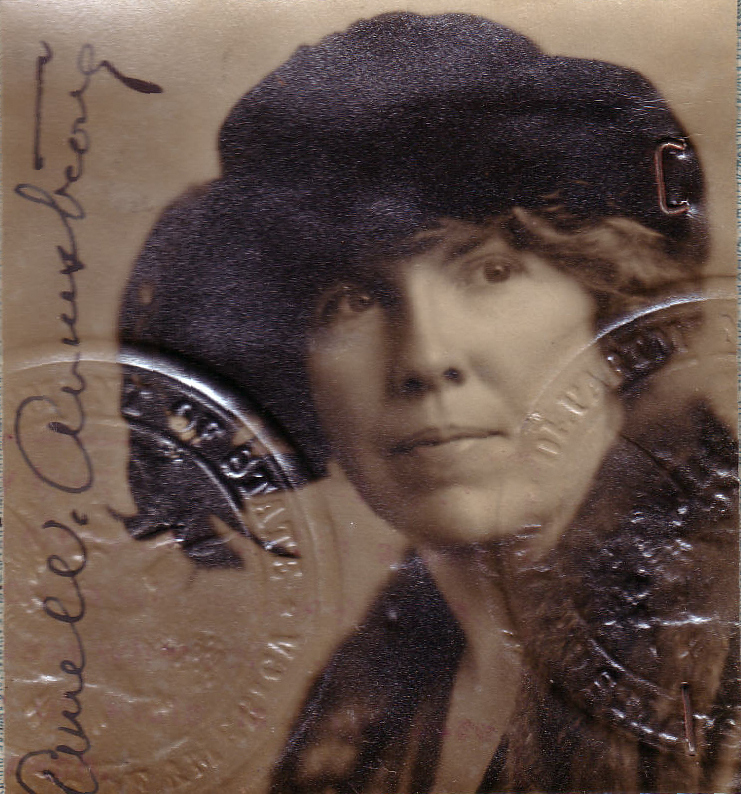
- Anne W. Armstrong (1924)
- Born: Anne Audubon Wetzell; September 20, 1872; Grand Rapids, Michigan, United States
- Died: March 17, 1958 (aged 85); Abingdon, Virginia, United States
- Education: Mount Holyoke College; University of Chicago
- Occupations: Businesswoman, novelist
- Spouse(s): Leonard T. Waldron; Robert F. Armstrong
- Children: Roger Waldron
- Relatives: Adelia Armstrong Lutz (sister-in-law)
- Writing career
- Notable works: The Seas of God (1915); This Day and Time (1930)

Anne Wetzell Armstrong (September 20, 1872 – March 17, 1958) was an American novelist and businesswoman, active primarily in the first half of the 20th century. She is best known for her novel, This Day and Time, an account of life in a rural Appalachian community. She was also a pioneering woman in business management, and was the first woman to lecture before the Harvard School of Business and Dartmouth's Tuck School of Business in the early 1920s.

== Biography ==
Armstrong was born Anne Audubon Wetzell in Grand Rapids, Michigan, in 1872. In the 1880s, her family moved to Knoxville, Tennessee, where her father operated a lumber company. She attended Mount Holyoke College, where she wrote for the school's newspaper, and later attended the University of Chicago. She had returned to Knoxville by 1892, when she married Leonard T. Waldron. They had one son before divorcing in 1894. In 1905, she married Robert F. Armstrong. She renamed her son Roger Franklin Armstrong. He graduated from the Naval Academy in the Class of 1918, and he died in a plane crash in 1922.

Armstrong published her first novel, The Seas of God, in 1915. In 1918, she was hired as a personnel director for the National City Company of New York. She later gave an account of her early days with this company in her article, "A Woman in Wall Street by One," which was published in The Atlantic Monthly in 1925. In 1919, Armstrong was hired as the Assistant Manager for Industrial Relations for Eastman Kodak, and continued in this position until 1923. During the latter half of the decade, she published several articles in Harper's Monthly and The Atlantic Monthly that focused on the emerging role of women in business.

In the late 1920s, Armstrong retired and moved to the Big Creek community in rural Sullivan County, Tennessee, which would provide the inspiration for her 1930 novel, This Day and Time. During this same period, she began a correspondence with author Thomas Wolfe, and began writing her autobiography, Of Time and Knoxville, a portion of which was published as "The Branner House" in The Yale Review in 1938. Three of Wolfe's letters to Armstrong were published in the 1956 collection, The Letters of Thomas Wolfe.

In the 1940s, the Tennessee Valley Authority completed South Holston Dam, effectively inundating the Big Creek community, which straddled the South Fork Holston just upstream from the dam. Armstrong moved to various places around the Southeast before settling in Abingdon, Virginia. She lived in the Barter Inn in Abingdon until her death in 1958.

== Writing ==
Armstrong's first novel, The Seas of God, tells the story of a young woman, Lydia Lambright, and her struggles to survive as an unwed mother amidst the moral constraints of Victorian society. The story opens in Kingsville, a fictional Southern town (based on Knoxville) where Lydia's dying father, a professor, has been ostracized for teaching the Theory of Evolution. Bitter over her father's treatment, she leaves Kingsville, and eventually winds up in New York. An illicit affair with a married man leaves her pregnant, and she gradually sinks into poverty. Unable to find gainful employment, she becomes a prostitute, and while her financial situation drastically improves, she struggles with what she deems a pointless existence.

Armstrong's second novel, This Day and Time, takes place in an early 20th-century rural Appalachian community based primarily on the Big Creek area of Sullivan County, Tennessee. The story focuses on Ivy, a mountain woman who returns to a life of subsistence farming after spending several distasteful years as a wage-earner in a nearby city. Armstrong's characters speak in a local Appalachian dialect, and the book discusses many aspects of life in early-20th century rural Appalachia, including funerary and agricultural customs, and life in a logging town.

Armstrong's business writings typically focused on the status of women in the business world. Her 1927 article, "Are Business Women Getting a Square Deal," traces the gradual acceptance of women in the workplace, from the 1880s through the post-World War period. In the 1928 article, "Have Women Changed Business," Armstrong complains that businesswomen have failed to make business more ethical, falling short of goals set forth by women's movement leaders such as Nellie Ross. In "Seven Deadly Sins of Women in Business," she advises women not to try to imitate men in dress and manners, but instead focus on what their feminine nature can bring to the workplace.

== Bibliography ==
=== Books ===
- The Seas of God (1915)
- This Day and Time (1930)
- Of Time and Knoxville: Fragment of an Autobiography (Unpublished; typescript on file at East Tennessee State University)

=== Articles ===
- "A Woman in Wall Street by One" (The Atlantic Monthly, August 1925)
- "Seven Deadly Sins of Women in Business" (Harper's Monthly, August 1926)
- "Uneasy Business" (The Atlantic Monthly, January 1927)
- "Fear in Business Life" (Harper's Monthly, April 1927)
- "Are Business Women Getting a Square Deal?" (The Atlantic Monthly, July 1927)
- "Business Bourbons" (Virginia Quarterly Review, April 1928)
- "Have Women Changed Business?" (Harper's Monthly, December 1928)
- "The Southern Mountaineers" (Yale Review, March 1935)
- "A Writer's Friends" (The Atlantic Monthly, June 1935)
- "The Branner House" (Yale Review, March 1938)
- "Romantic Cook-Book" (Yale Review, December 1939)
- "As I Saw Thomas Wolfe" (Arizona Quarterly, Spring 1946)
- "Fashions in Grandmothers" (Saturday Review of Literature, 21 December 1946)
