= Sequoyah Hills =

Neighborhood of Knoxville, Tennessee, United States

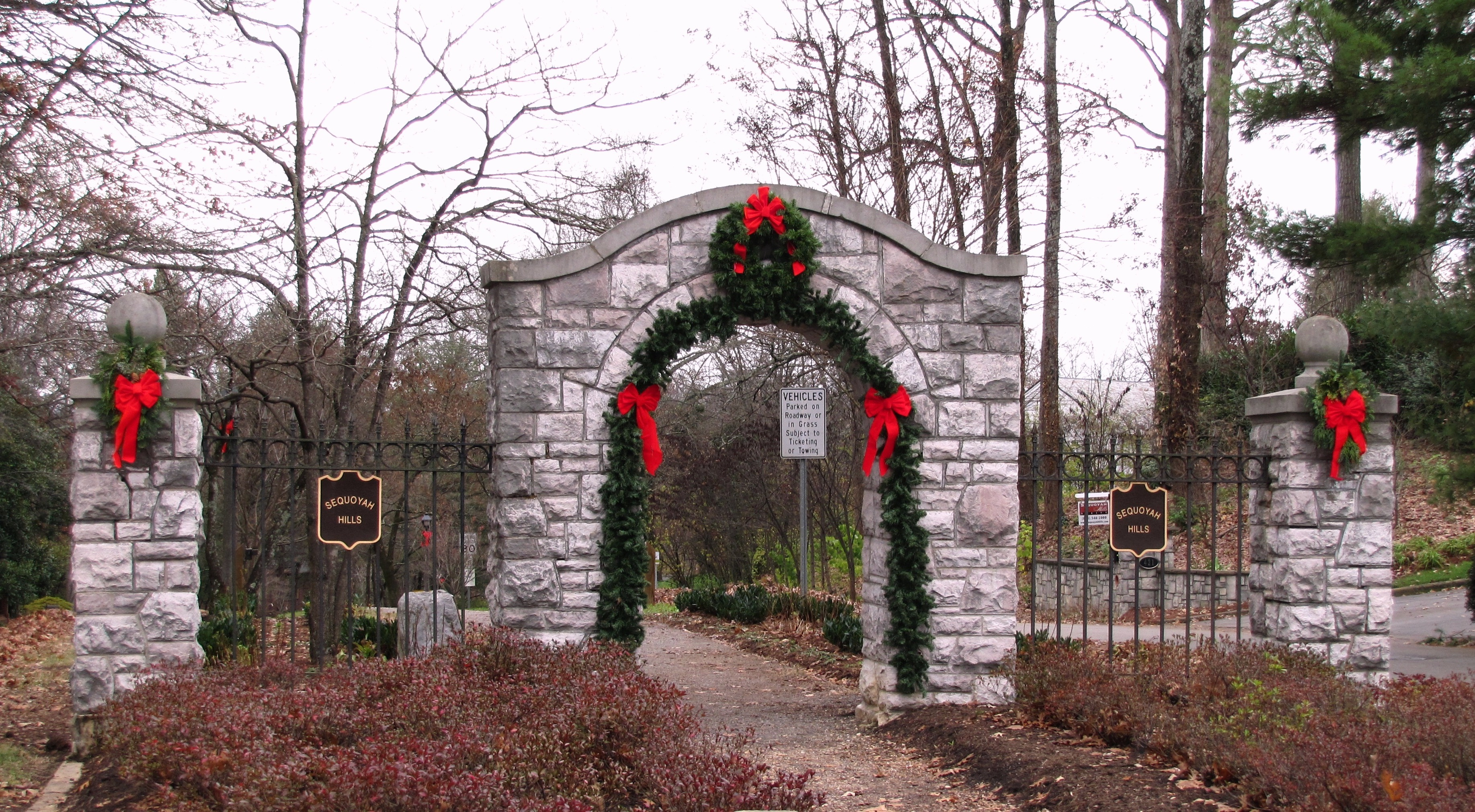
Entrance to Sequoyah Hills at intersection of Cherokee Boulevard and Kingston Pike

Sequoyah Hills is a neighborhood in Knoxville, Tennessee, United States, named for the Cherokee scholar Sequoyah. It is located off Kingston Pike, between the city's downtown and West Knoxville. Initially developed in the 1920s, Sequoyah Hills was one of Knoxville's first suburbs and today is home to some of the city's most affluent residents. The neighborhood contains numerous notable examples of mid-20th century residential architecture, with houses designed by architects such as Charles I. Barber, Benjamin McMurry, and Francis Keally.

Originally an agricultural area called Looney's Bend, the modern Sequoyah Hills neighborhood is largely rooted in the development efforts of 1920s-era visionary entrepreneurs E. V. Ferrell, who developed the Scenic Drive area, and Robert L. Foust, who established the "Talahi" subdivision in the vicinity of Cherokee Boulevard and Talahi Drive. Foust and Ferrell advertised their respective developments as utopian getaways where Knoxville's elite could escape the ills of congested city life. While the Great Depression led to the financial collapse of the Talahi project and Foust's subsequent suicide, Sequoyah Hills nevertheless continued to develop over the years as Foust had envisioned.

Cherokee Boulevard was home to Knoxville's first Dogwood Arts Trail, which was established in 1955. In 1979, the Talahi Improvements, which consist of several early landscape elements from Foust's Talahi development, were listed on the National Register of Historic Places.

== Location ==
Sequoyah Hills is located on a peninsula created by a bend of the Tennessee River known as Looney's Bend. The neighborhood is bounded by the river on the east, south, and west, and by Kingston Pike (US-70/US-11) on the north, though the Kingston Pike/Sequoyah Hills Neighborhood Association includes several streets just north of Kingston Pike. The area is generally hilly, with a 10 to 15-foot bluff rising above the rivershore along most of the neighborhood's southern edge. From the edge of the bluff, the land gradually slopes upward, reaching approximately 40 feet (12 m) above the river, affording houses along the upper slopes sweeping views of the river and Knoxville in the distance.

Sequoyah Park, which occupies most of the south side of the neighborhood, lies in the floodplain between the rivershore and base of the bluff. Cherokee Boulevard, a boulevard with a grassy median dividing the right and left lanes, runs in a U-shape around the edge of the peninsula. The other main road, Scenic Drive/Southgate Road, runs roughly north-to-south across the center of the peninsula. A small commercial center, known as Council Point, is concentrated around the intersection of Kenesaw and Keowee avenues.

== History ==
=== Early history ===
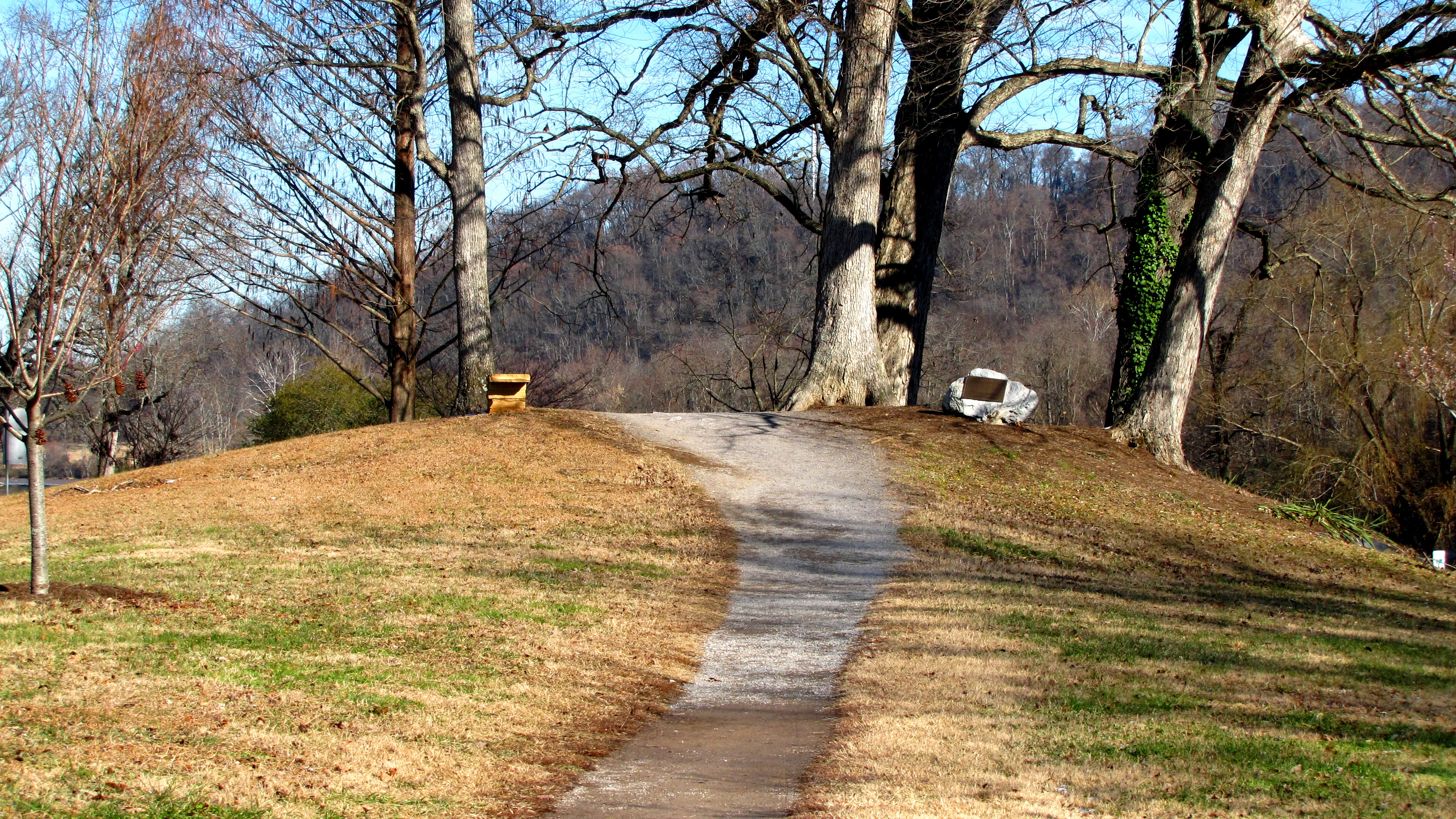
Late Woodland burial mound along Cherokee Boulevard

What is now Sequoyah Hills was inhabited by Native Americans as early as the Late Woodland period (c. 500–1100 A.D.), as indicated by a 1,000-year-old Indian mound that rises in the median of Cherokee Boulevard. By the 18th century, the area was under control of the Cherokee, whose Overhill towns lay along the Little Tennessee River to the southwest. The neighborhood's namesake, Sequoyah, was born in the Overhill town of Tuskegee around 1767.

In 1796, Moses Looney, who had served in various capacities with the failed State of Franklin during the 1780s, acquired a 700-acre (280 ha) tract of land in what is now Sequoyah Hills. He and his descendants remained on the land for several decades, and the area became known as "Looney's Bend." Other early landowners in the Sequoyah Hills area included future Knoxville mayor James Park, who purchased a 200-acre (81 ha) tract in 1804; William Lyon, who built a house and mill near the modern intersection of Lyon's View Pike and Northshore Drive around 1810; and Drury Armstrong (builder of Crescent Bend), who acquired a large tract of land west of modern Scenic Drive in 1846.

The oldest house still extant in Sequoyah Hills, which currently stands at 715 Scenic Drive, was originally built in the 1850s as a tenant house on the farm of Allen Johnson. Around 1814 George White, son-in-law of James Park and grandson of Knoxville founder James White, built a house along what is now Woodhill Place. While this house is no longer standing, foundation remnants of a barn that accompanied the house can be seen along Scenic Drive.

=== Early development ===
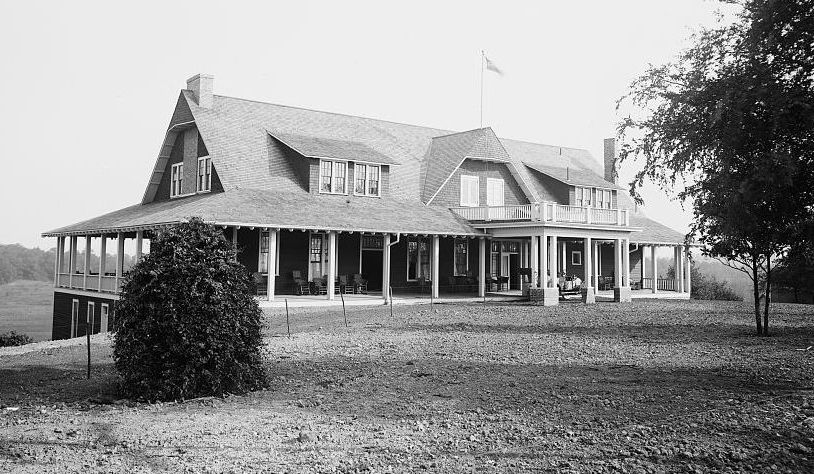
The "old" Cherokee Country Club, circa 1910

In 1890 Francis Huger, superintendent of the East Tennessee, Virginia and Georgia Railway, acquired over 450 acres (180 ha) in Sequoyah Hills with the intent of moving a steel mill to the area. The Panic of 1893 doomed this venture, however, and the land was distributed to Huger's creditors in 1908. Knox County road commissioner Peter Blow built a house on the south bank of the river opposite Sequoyah Hills in 1910, where he operated a ferry. Blow's Ferry Road, which connected the ferry to Kingston Pike, is believed to have been built along a trail that once accessed a cemetery containing the graves of Civil War soldiers and slaves.

In 1907, several Knoxville businessmen established the Cherokee Country Club on Lyon's View Pike and erected a clubhouse on a hill with a commanding view of the river valley and the Great Smoky Mountains beyond. The original clubhouse was eventually demolished and replaced with the current building, designed by the noted Knoxville architectural firm Baumann and Baumann, in 1928. In 1913, trolley tracks were extended along Kingston Pike to its Lyon's View Pike junction, aiding in the development of the area. What is now Sequoyah Hills was annexed by Knoxville in 1917.

With the advent of the automobile, affluent Knoxvillians began fleeing the congested urban neighborhoods for more spacious areas on the city's periphery. By 1920, several elegant residences, such as the H.L. Dulin House (1915) on Kingston Pike and the C. Powell Smith (1913) and E.C. Mahan (1920) residences on Lyon's View Pike, had been built near Sequoyah Hills. In 1921, Regal Manufacturing president S. D. Coykendall commissioned noted Knoxville architectural firm Barber & McMurry to build a house on what is now Scenic Drive.

=== Talahi and Sequoyah Hills ===
In the mid-1920s, E. V. Ferrell began major residential development in Sequoyah Hills. To connect his holdings along the peninsula, he built Cherokee Boulevard (named for the Indian mound in the road's median) and improved Scenic Drive as far as its modern intersection with Bluff and Southgate (a gate at this point inspired the name of the latter). Ferrell chose the name "Sequoyah Hills" to match the name of Cherokee Boulevard. By 1924, houses had been built at 901, 919, 927 and 937 Scenic Drive, and 50 lots had been sold by the end of the decade.

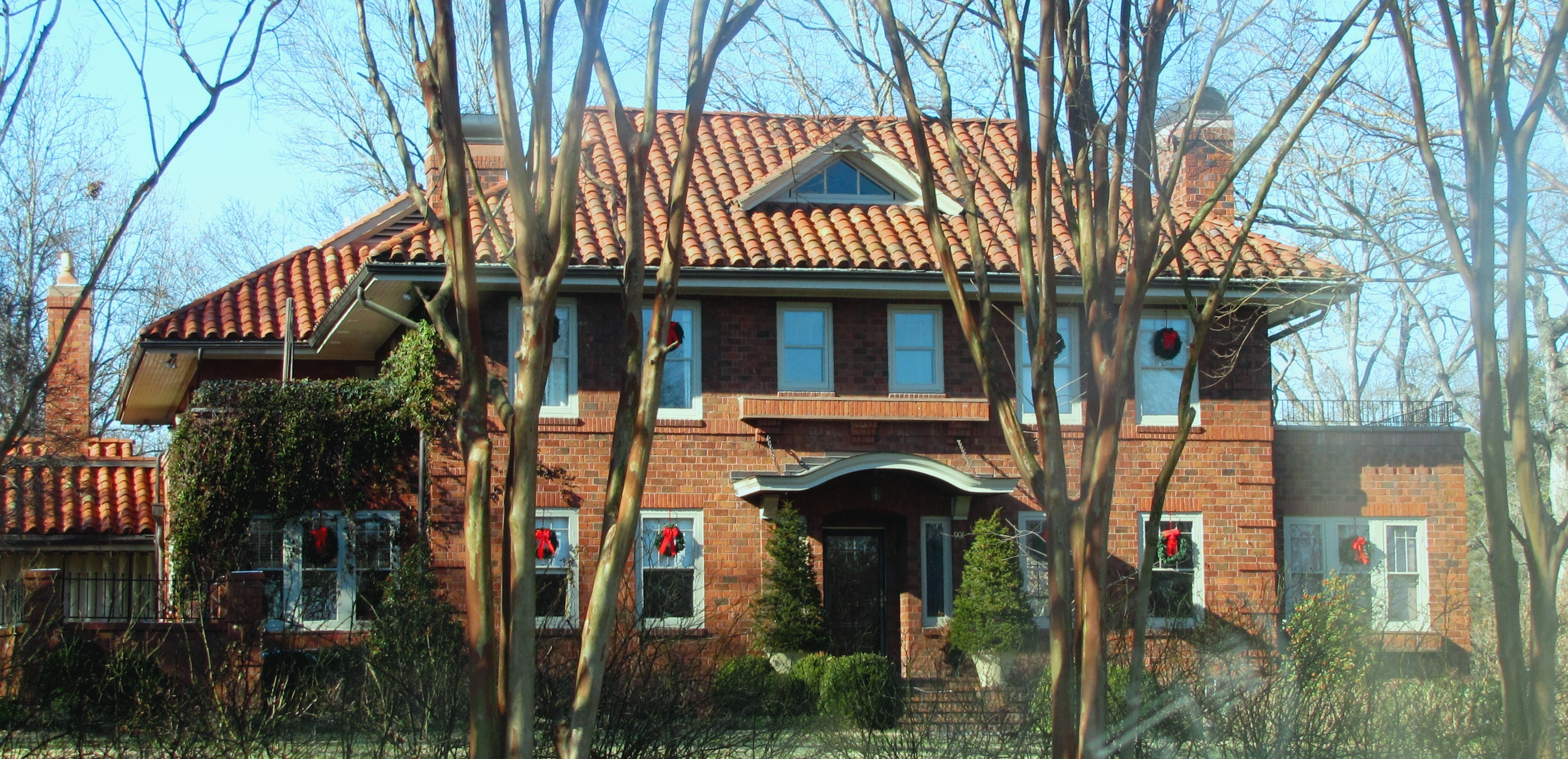
Prairie-style house along Scenic Drive, built in 1924

In 1926 Robert Foust, a partner in the real estate firm Alex McMillan Company, purchased a 100-acre (40 ha) tract of land on the southeast section of Looney's Bend with plans to develop a premier subdivision for Knoxville. Foust envisioned a neighborhood for those "who insist upon and can afford the best," and where "all the ugliness of city life has been shut out." He named the new subdivision "Talahi," Cherokee for "standing oak forest." The new neighborhood, Foust believed, would bring together "an Indian past, a technical future, and a natural forest setting."

Foust recruited landscape designer Earle S. Draper to oversee Talahi's complex landscape designs. The plans called for curvilinear streets, preservation of mature trees wherever possible, and underground utilities. Lot sizes were to be no less than 5,000 square feet and were restricted to single-family homes. Foust's restrictions called for all houses to be built in English Cottage or American Colonial Revival styles (this restriction was abandoned by subsequent developers). A country club was to be built along the river bank.

Between 1927 and 1929, Foust constructed several landscape features, including entrance pylons, fountains, and a park (Papoose Park). Talahi was opened to sales in the spring of 1929. Only one lot—940 Cherokee Boulevard—was sold before the stock market crashed later that year. In the early 1930s, lots in Talahi, originally marketed in the $4,000 to $10,000 range, were selling for just $600. His finances in ruins, Foust committed suicide in September 1933.

== Notable buildings and structures ==
- Talahi Improvements
- U.S. National Register of Historic Places
- U.S. Historic district
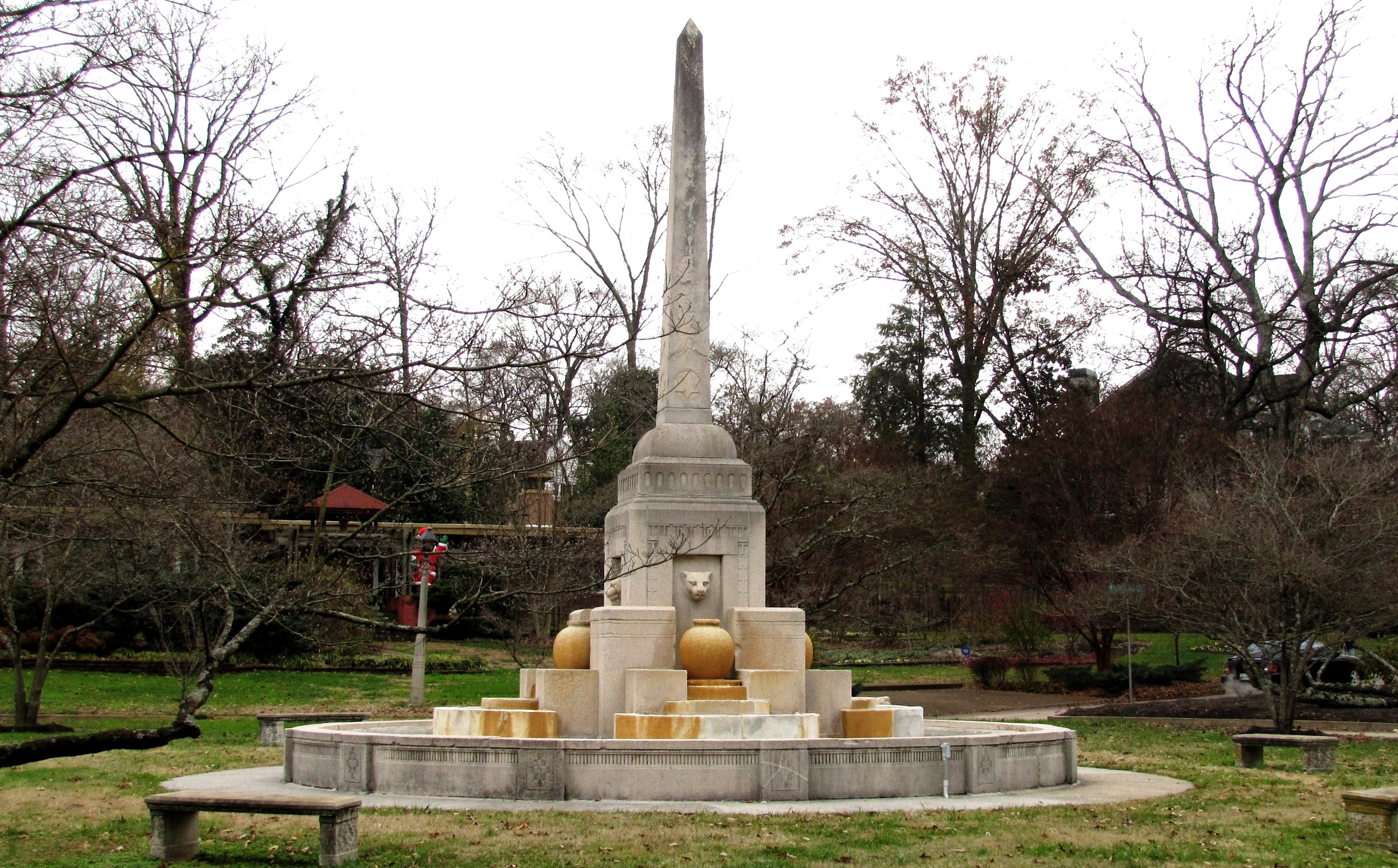
- Panther Fountain

- Location within Tennessee Location within the United States
- Location: Cherokee Boulevard, Iskagna Drive, Kenesaw Avenue, Keowee Drive, Talahi Drive, Taliluna Avenue and Tugaloo Drive; Knoxville, Tennessee
- Coordinates: 35°56′09″N 83°57′24″W
- Area: 18 acres (7.3 ha)
- Built: 1929
- NRHP reference No.: 79002447
- Added to NRHP: December 26, 1979

=== Talahi Improvements ===
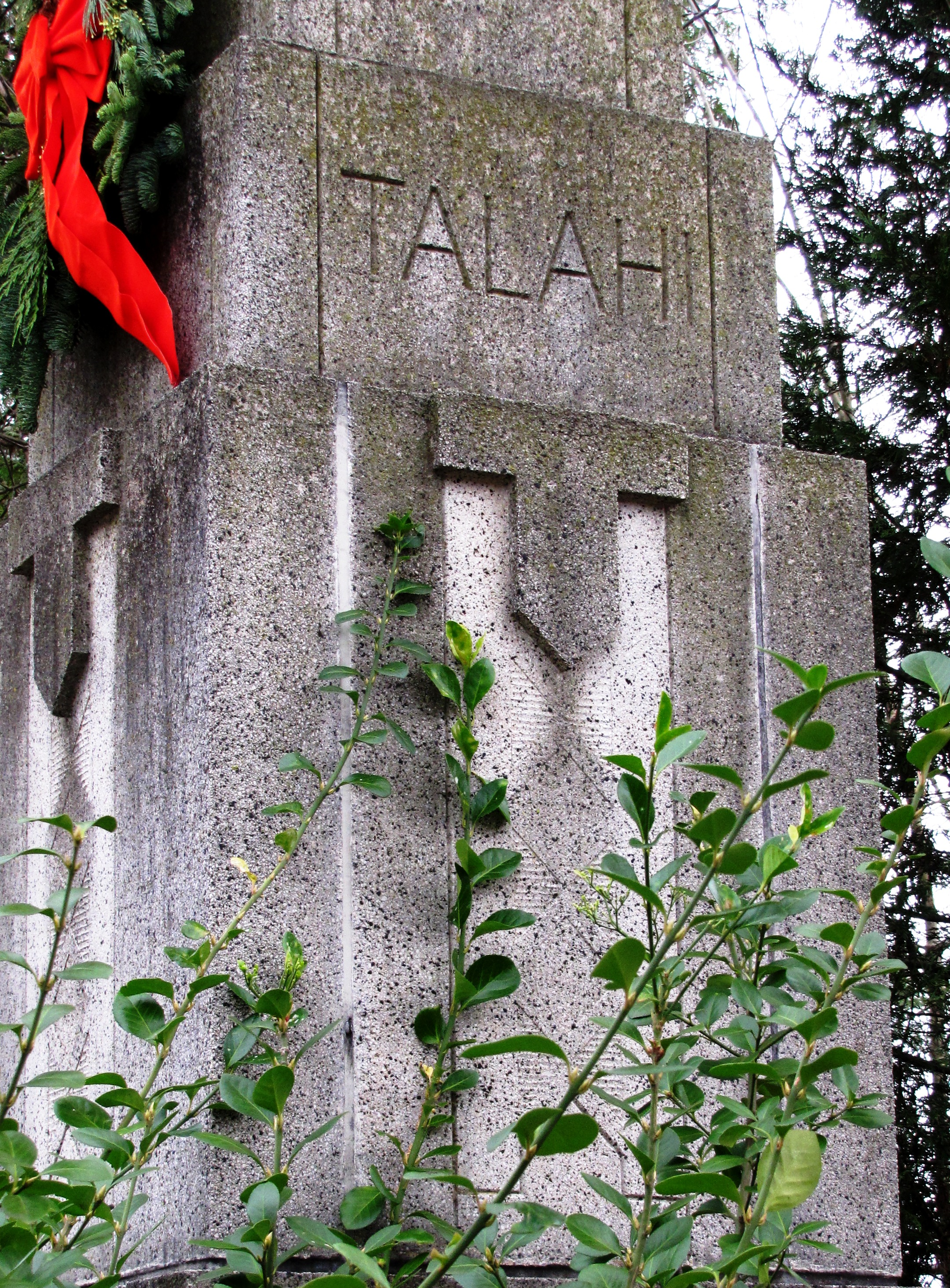
Gatepost along Cherokee Boulevard

Before the stock market crash ruined his development efforts in 1929, Foust managed to complete several landscape improvements in the proposed Talahi subdivision. These include gateposts at either end of the subdivision along Cherokee Boulevard, two fountains, a park, streetlight standards, and stone benches. The roads were originally paved in concrete, which has been preserved along parts of Talahi Drive, Iskagna Drive, and Taliluna Avenue.

The Talahi Improvements are concentrated primarily between the intersections of Talahi Drive and Cherokee Boulevard and Talahi Drive and Taliluna Avenue, with islands in both intersections containing the two fountains, called "Sunhouse Fountain" and "Panther Fountain," respectively. Papoose Park, which is surrounded by an iron fence, is situated in the median along Talahi Drive between the two intersections. Stone walls with inset benches form a broken circle around the Cherokee Boulevard/Talahi Drive intersection, with the north walls opening toward Papoose Park, and the south walls opening toward the lake, where the proposed country club was to be built.

Sunhouse Fountain is a circular stone fountain with twelve small posts, each decorated with a sunburst motif, and each originally surmounted by a bronze frog (the frogs have since been removed). Panther Fountain is a circular fountain with a central obelisk resting atop a base of varying geometric shapes. Water was discharged through panther heads on each of the four sides of the base. Cherokee motifs decorate the gateposts, pylons, and fountains, suggesting inspiration from both Cherokee folklore and the Art Deco movement's emphasis on abstract figures.

=== Houses ===
- The Jenkins House on Cherokee Boulevard, built in 1955 and designed by noted Knoxville architect Ben McMurry, Jr., of the firm Barber & McMurry. In 2008, the magazine Oxford American profiled this house in its list of the best modern homes of the southeast.

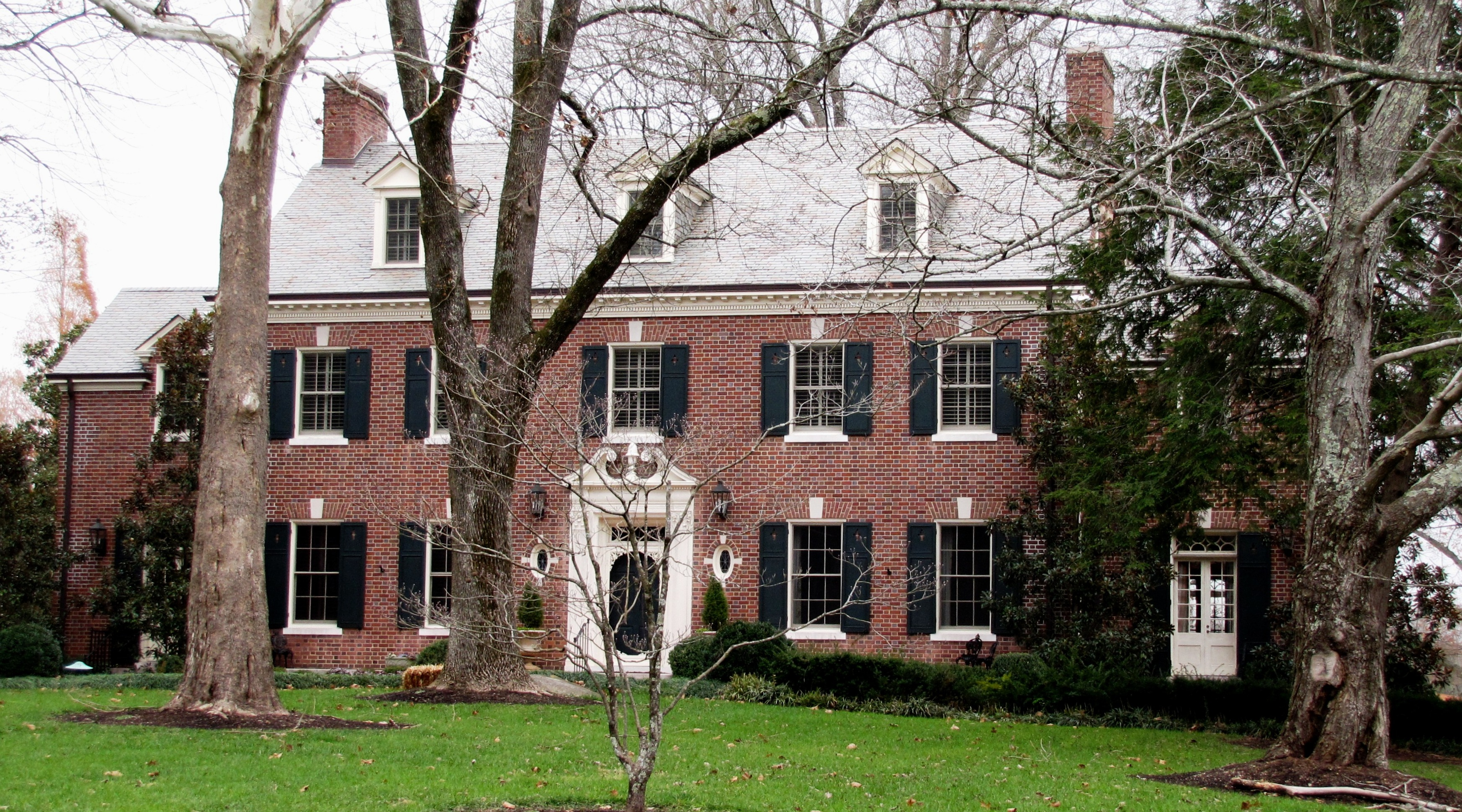
UT president's house at 940 Cherokee Boulevard

- University of Tennessee president's house (940 Cherokee Boulevard), a Georgian Revival-style house built by Nashville surgeon Walter S. Nash in the 1930s after the Nash family home in downtown Knoxville was demolished for the construction of the Knoxville Post Office. Nash purchased the sole lot in Talahi before Foust's company collapsed into financial ruin. The University of Tennessee purchased the house in 1960 from Nash's son-in-law and daughter, Ray Jenkins and Eva Nash Jenkins, and used it as its presidential mansion until 2009.
- Thomas House (715 Scenic Drive), the oldest extant house in Sequoyah Hills, originally built in the 1850s as a tenant house on the farm of Allen Johnson. The Towle family purchased the farm in 1899 and in turn sold it to developer N.E. Logan in 1923.
- 726 Scenic Drive, a one-story Minimal Traditional-style Gunnison home built in 1948. Gunnison homes were a type of prefabricated house popular in the years following World War II.
- 934 Scenic Drive, a 2.5-story Tudor Revival-style house built in 1928, designed by landscape architect Elizabeth Dunlap.
- 937 Scenic Drive, a two-story Neoclassical-style house built in 1924, designed by the architectural firm Barber & McMurry.
- 1029 Scenic Drive, a two-story Neoclassical-style house built in 1930, designed Barber & McMurry.
- Lockett House (1065 Scenic Drive), a two-story Neoclassical-style house built in 1931, designed by the architectural firm Baumann and Baumann. The property includes an old log cabin moved from Jefferson County.
- 1079 Scenic Drive, a two-story art moderne house built in 1935, designed by Dunlap.
- 1119 Scenic Drive, a 1.5-story Tudor Revival-style house built in 1940 for Dr. Clifford E. Barbour, designed by architect Francis Keally and landscape architect Arthur F. Brinkerhoff.

=== Other buildings ===
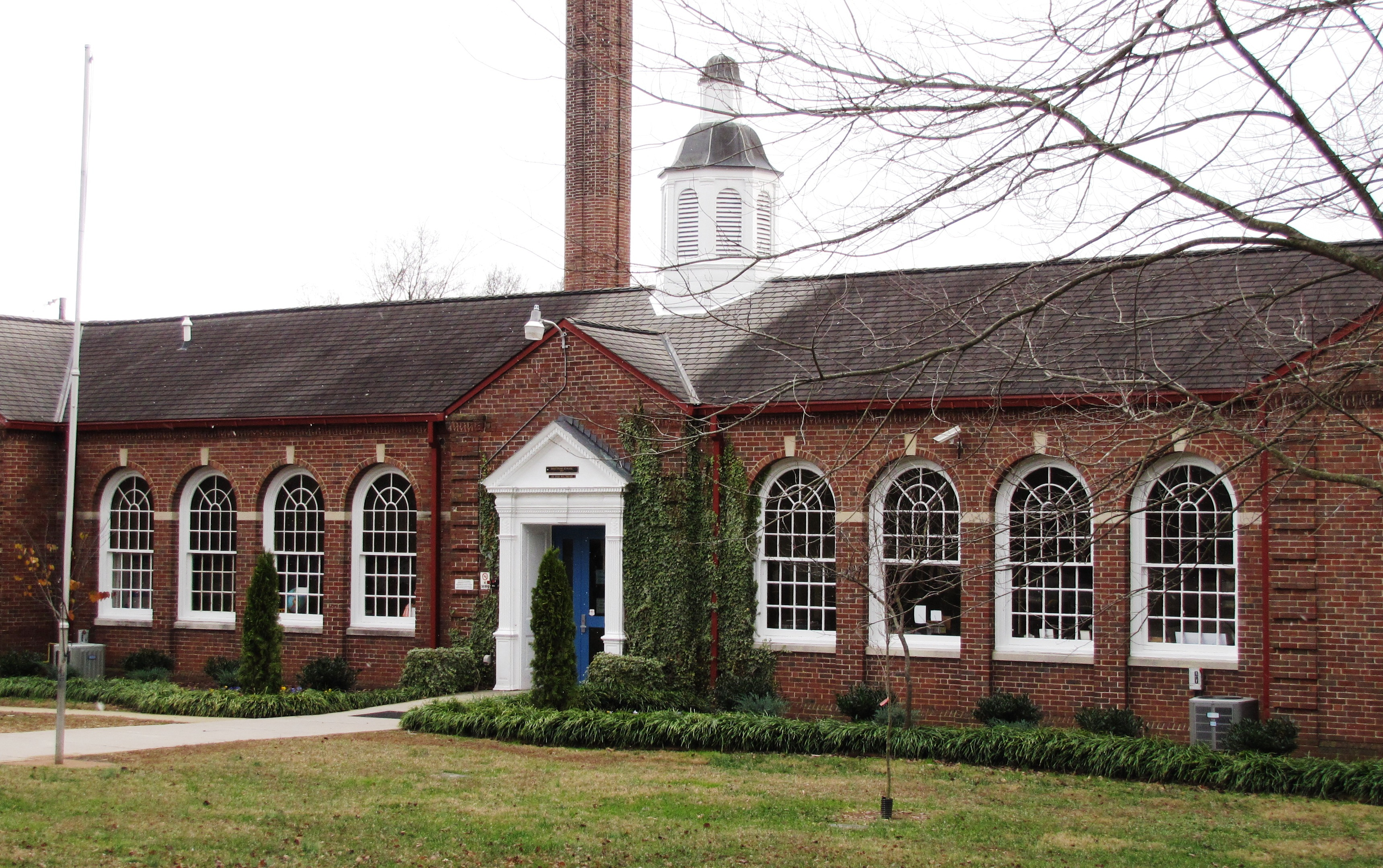
Sequoyah Elementary School

- Sequoyah Elementary School, the original part of which (facing Sagwa Drive) was built in 1929, designed by the architectural firm Barber McMurry.
- Sequoyah Hills Presbyterian Church, founded in 1947; the current church building was completed in 1954.

== Notable residents ==
Notable residents of Sequoyah Hills have included Senator Howard H. Baker, Jr., businessman Jim Clayton (owner of Clayton Homes), author Alex Haley, members of the Haslam family including Governor Bill Haslam, author Cormac McCarthy, actress Patricia Neal, Tennessee Volunteers football coach Robert R. Neyland, actor David Keith, Knoxville mayors George Roby Dempster and Benjamin Morton, and photographer James Edward Thompson.
