= Crescent Bend =

Historic house in Tennessee, United States

- U.S. Historic district – Contributing property
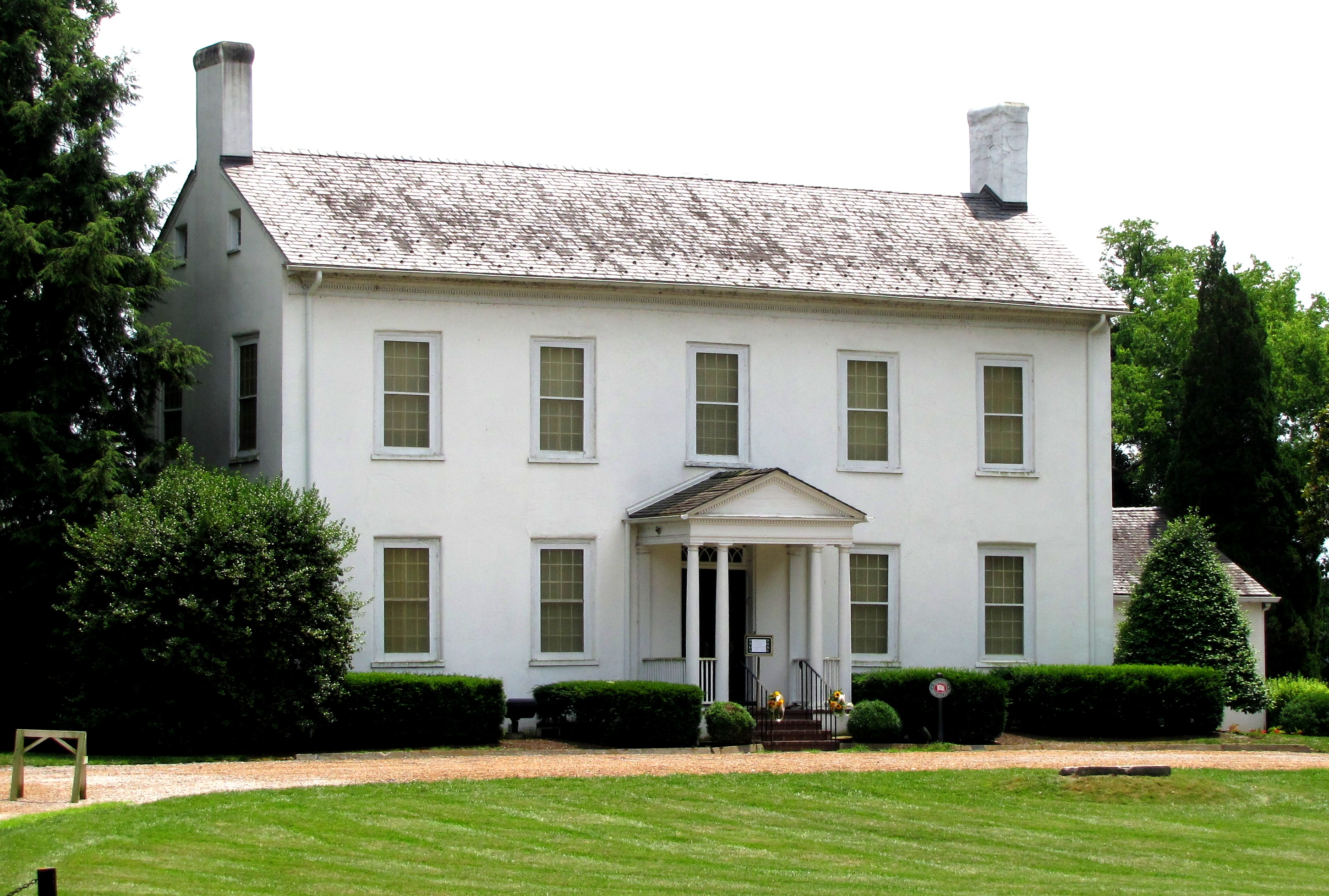
- Crescent Bend

- Location within Tennessee Location within the United States
- Location: 2728 Kingston Pike; Knoxville, Tennessee
- Coordinates: 35°57′3.9″N 83°56′57.5″W
- Part of: Kingston Pike Historic District (ID96001404)
- Designated CP: December 4, 1996

Crescent Bend is a historic home at 2728 Kingston Pike in Knoxville, Tennessee. The building is known as Crescent Bend because of its location on a bend of the Tennessee River. It is also known as the Armstrong-Lockett House, Longview and Logueval.

Crescent Bend was built in 1834 by Drury Paine Armstrong (1799–1856), a farmer, merchant and public official who estimated that the house had cost him $5,517. The house was once the centerpiece of a 600-acre (2.4 km^{2}) farm. This is one of three early homes built by the Armstrong family on Kingston Pike, the others being Bleak House, built by Drury's son, Robert H. Armstrong, and Westwood, built by Drury's granddaughter, Adelia Armstrong Lutz (1859–1931). It was later purchased by Percy Lockett. It was also Confederate General Joseph B. Kershaw's headquarters during the Siege of Knoxville.

It is a contributing property to the Kingston Pike Historic District, which is listed on the National Register of Historic Places. The home is a traditional brick farmhouse. The home's contents include 18th-century English and American furniture, decorative arts and silver. The property includes formal Italian gardens with nine terraces and five fountains. The house and gardens are open to the public.
