= Turkey Creek, Knoxville =

Mixed use retail and commercial development in Knoxville, Tennessee

Turkey Creek
- Location: West Knoxville-Farragut, Tennessee, United States
- Address: Parkside Drive from North Campbell Station Road to Lovell Road
- Coordinates: 35.899997°N 84.158101°W
- Status: Complete
- Constructed: 1995
- Opening: 2002
- Use: Retail, commerce, medical, professional, multi-family residential
- Website: turkeycreek.com

Companies
- Developer: Turkey Creek Land Partners

Technical details
- Cost: $50 million USD
- Size: 410 acres (170 ha)
- No. of tenants: 215

Turkey Creek is a shopping complex and mixed-use commercial development located in western Knox County, Tennessee, in the city of Knoxville and the town of Farragut.

== Overview ==
The development stretches for 3 miles (4.8 km) adjacent to a concurrent section of Interstates 40 and 75, spanning the distance between the Lovell Road and Campbell Station Road interchanges. Shopping centers in the complex include The Pinnacle at Turkey Creek (formerly Colonial Pinnacle & Promenade) featuring approximately 65 stores and restaurants, covering a gross leasable area of 654,000 square feet (60,800 m^{2}). Colonial Promenade contains 20 stores, with a gross leasable area of 280,776 square feet (26,084.9 m^{2}). Both were developed by Colonial Properties. A city of Knoxville greenway is located within the area, adjacent to the Turkey Creek wetland, which is managed by the Izaak Walton League.

== History ==
The Turkey Creek development project started in 1995 when a group of investors and developers who called themselves Turkey Creek Land Partners led by John Turley and Kerry Sprouse paid $7 million to buy 410 acres (170 ha) of undeveloped land south of the interstate highway. Their project included $30 million of developer-funded infrastructure and other improvements. Publicly funded road and highway improvements in support of the project included widening of the Interstate, reconfiguring the Lovell Road interchange, and local street improvements, at a total cost of $50 million. The city of Knoxville spent about $5 million and Knox County government contributed $1 million to extend Parkside Drive from Lovell Road to Campbell Station Road.
