= West Town Mall =

Shopping mall in Knoxville, Tennessee

Coordinates: 35.92497°N 84.03722°W

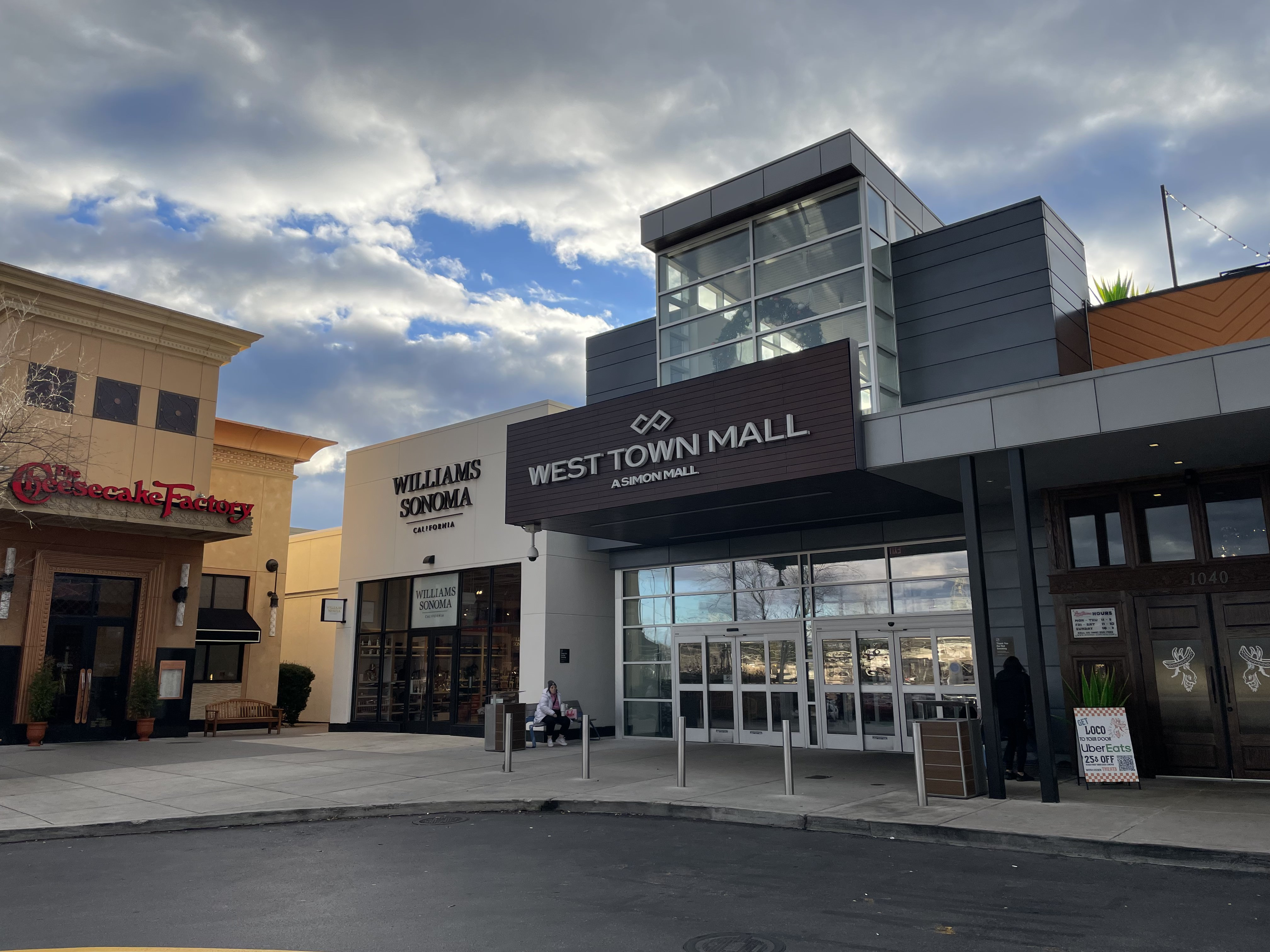
- Entrance to West Town Mall, January 2024 (post renovation)
- Location: Kingston Pike, Interstate 40, and Interstate 75, Knoxville, United States
- Opened: August 1972
- Manager: Simon Property Group
- Owner: Simon Property Group (50%)
- Num. of stores: 160
- Floor area: 1,341,519 square feet (124,631 m^{2}) (GLA)
- Floors: 1 plus 2nd floor access to Regal Cinebarre (2 in anchors except Belk Women)
- Website: www.simon.com/mall/west-town-mall

West Town Mall is a super-regional shopping mall located in Knoxville, Tennessee, United States. Opened in August 1972, this 1.5 level mall is located in the western portion of Knoxville in the West Hills community. West Town Mall is located along Interstates 40/75 and Kingston Pike. The mall has 1,339,000 square feet (124,397 m^{2}) of gross leasable area, making it the largest of any enclosed shopping mall in Tennessee. The anchor stores are Dillard's, Dick's House of Sport, 2 Belk stores, JCPenney, plus a Cinebarre.

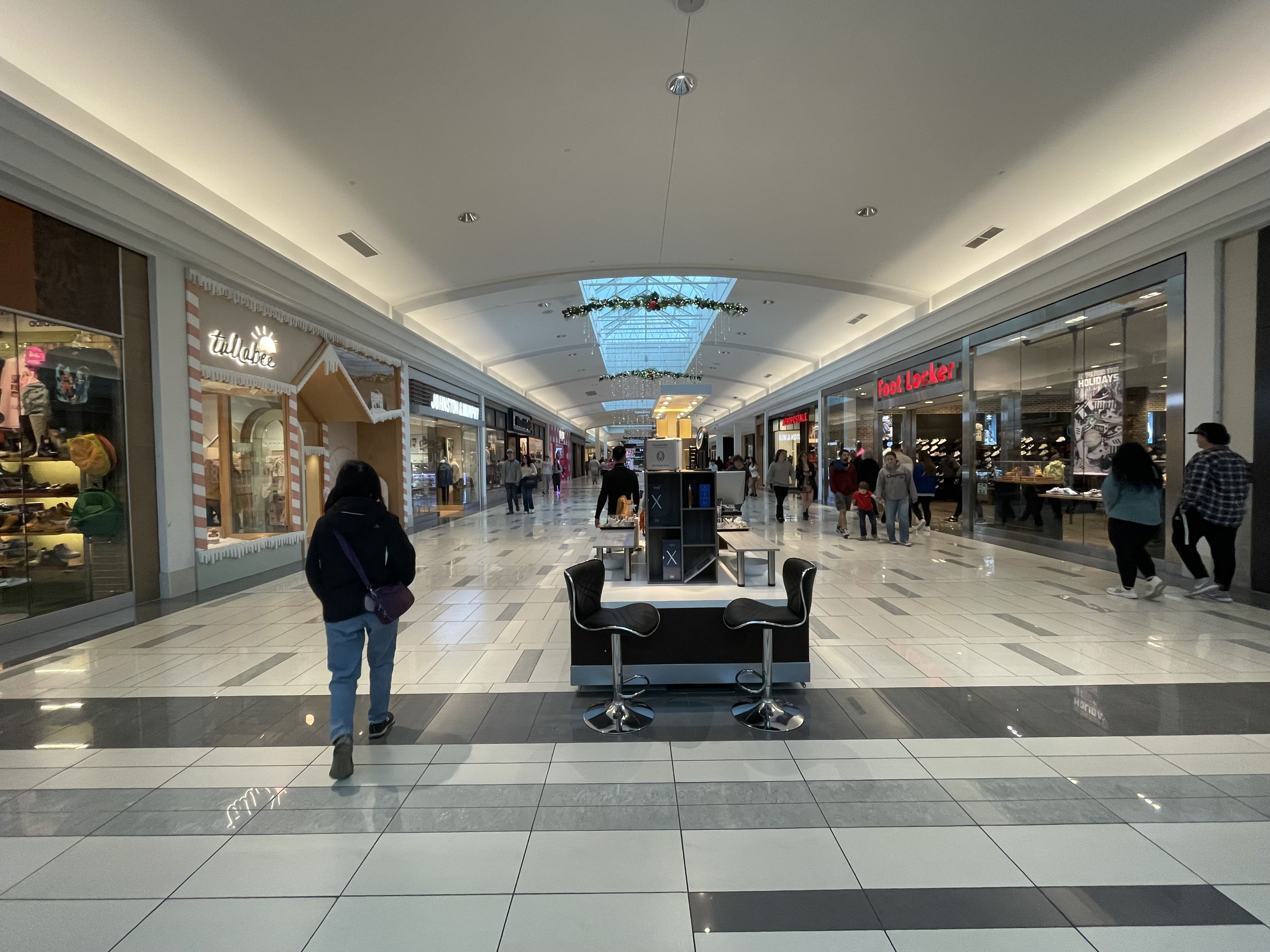
Interior of West Town Mall (Knoxville, TN)

There is a food court in the center of the mall. This was the original location of a junior anchor Frankenbergers Department Store until 1985. This food court was the first mall location for Knoxville-based Petro's Chili & Chips.

In 1994, there was a major expansion, which included 2 new anchors along with 32 smaller shops.

On October 15, 2018, it was announced that Sears would be closing as part of a plan to close 142 stores nationwide. The store closed on January 6, 2019, and demolition began on January 9, 2020 Subsequent to the demolition, it was replaced by Dick's House of Sport, a new concept by Dick's Sporting Goods.

== Anchors ==
- Belk Women- Northeast anchor (Opened in 1972 as Proffitt's, expanded in 1995, became Belk in 2006, then Belk Women in 2007)
- Belk Men, Home, and Children- Southwest anchor (Opened in 1994 as Parisian as part of an expansion, became Belk Men, Home, and Children in 2007)
- Dick's House of Sport- West anchor (Opened in 1972 as Sears, closed in 2019, was demolished in 2020 then rebuilt as Dick's House of Sport in 2021)
- Dillard's- Northwest anchor (Opened in 1972 as Miller's, became Hess's in 1987, then closed in 1992, expanded and became Dillard's in 1993)
- JCPenney- Southeast anchor (Opened in 1994 as part of an expansion)

Former anchors

- JCPenney (Opened in 1972, relocated in 1994)
- Sears (Opened in 1972, closed in 2019 and demolished in 2020)
- Frankenbergers (Opened in 1972, closed in 1985, became the food court)

== Movie theaters ==
In 1998, Knoxville based Regal Entertainment Group opened a Funscape entertainment complex in the mall. In 2018, the Regal Cinemas was rebranded to Cinebarre.

Records
| Preceded by Hamilton Place; Chattanooga, Tennessee | Largest mall in Tennessee; 1994–present | Succeeded by |
