= William Blount Mansion =

Historic house in Knoxville, Tennessee

- U.S. National Register of Historic Places
- U.S. National Historic Landmark
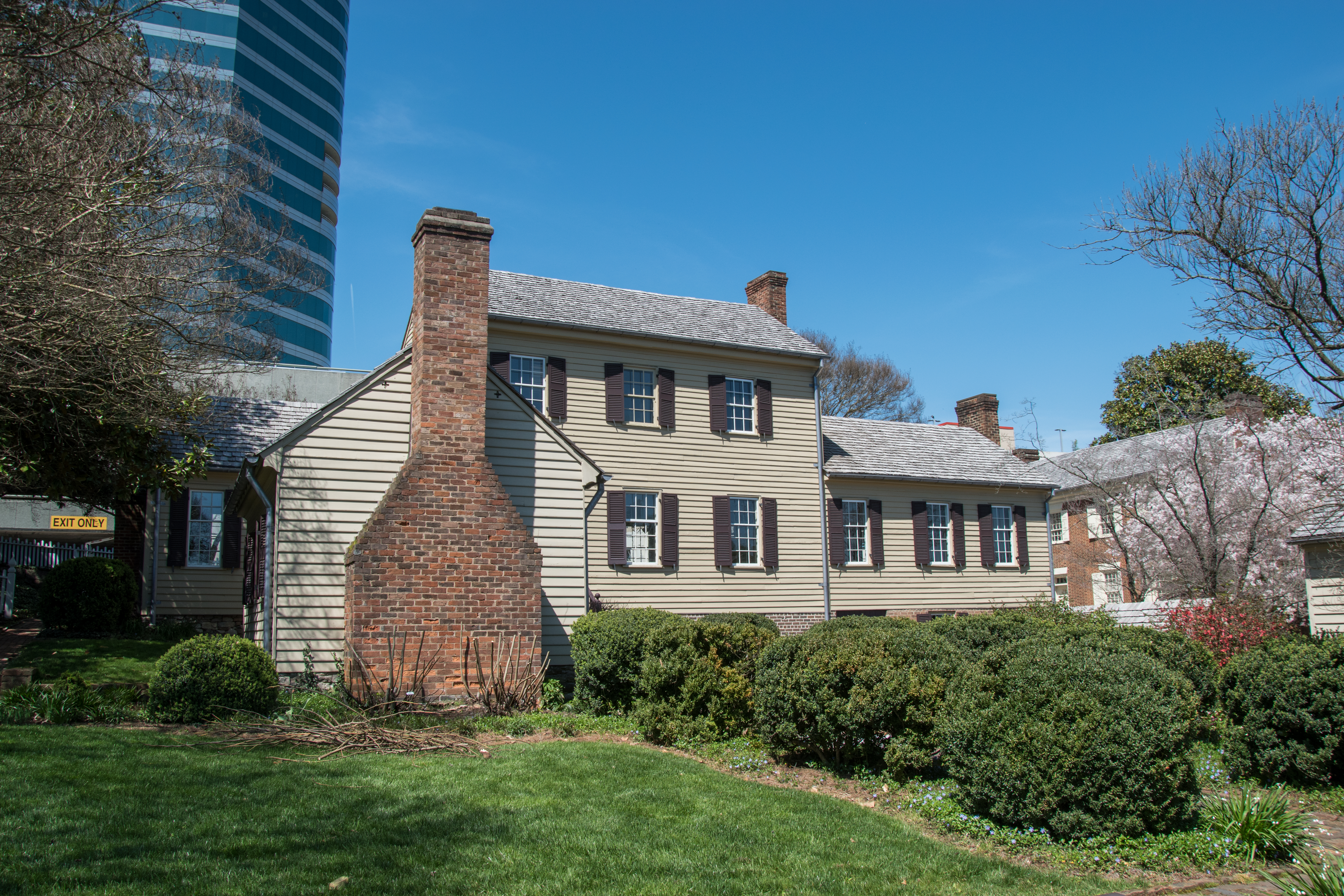
- Blount Mansion with kitchen in foreground

- Location within Tennessee Location within the United States
- Interactive map showing the location of William Blount Mansion
- Location: 200 W. Hill Ave., Knoxville, Tennessee
- Coordinates: 35°57′40″N 83°54′54.7″W
- Built: 1792
- Architect: William Blount
- NRHP reference No.: 66000726

Significant dates
- Added to NRHP: October 15, 1966
- Designated NHL: January 12, 1965

The Blount Mansion, also known as William Blount Mansion, located at 200 West Hill Avenue in downtown Knoxville, Tennessee, was the home of the only territorial governor of the Southwest Territory, William Blount (1749–1800). Blount, a Founding Father of the United States, a signer of the United States Constitution, and a U.S. Senator from Tennessee, lived on the property with his family and ten African-American slaves. The mansion served as the de facto capitol of the Southwest Territory. In 1796, much of the Tennessee Constitution was drafted in Governor Blount's office at the mansion. Tennessee state historian John Trotwood Moore once called Blount Mansion "the most important historical spot in Tennessee."

The house is a wood-frame home sheathed in wood siding, built with materials brought from North Carolina in an era when most homes in Tennessee were log cabins. The two-story central portion of the home is the oldest section. The one-story west wing is believed to have been constructed next; archaeologists suspect the west wing was originally an outbuilding, which was then moved and attached to the main house, and there is some evidence the west wing was originally the servants' quarters. The one-story east wing was the final section to be constructed, perhaps as late as 1820. Blount's office, from which he governed and conducted his business affairs, was built along with the house and is a one-story, free-standing building and had a modest front porch.

By 1925, the house had deteriorated, and a local developer, B.H. Sprankle, intended to demolish it and replace it with a parking lot to serve the new Andrew Johnson Hotel, then under construction. The Blount Mansion Association was chartered the following year, and after a massive publicity campaign by Mary Boyce Temple and the Bonnie Kate Chapter of the Daughters of the American Revolution and the East Tennessee Historical Society, the Association raised enough money to purchase the house in 1930. The Blount Mansion Association has since maintained the house as a museum, and has made numerous renovations to restore the house and property to its late 18th-century appearance. In the 1960s, the mansion was designated a National Historic Landmark.

== Location ==
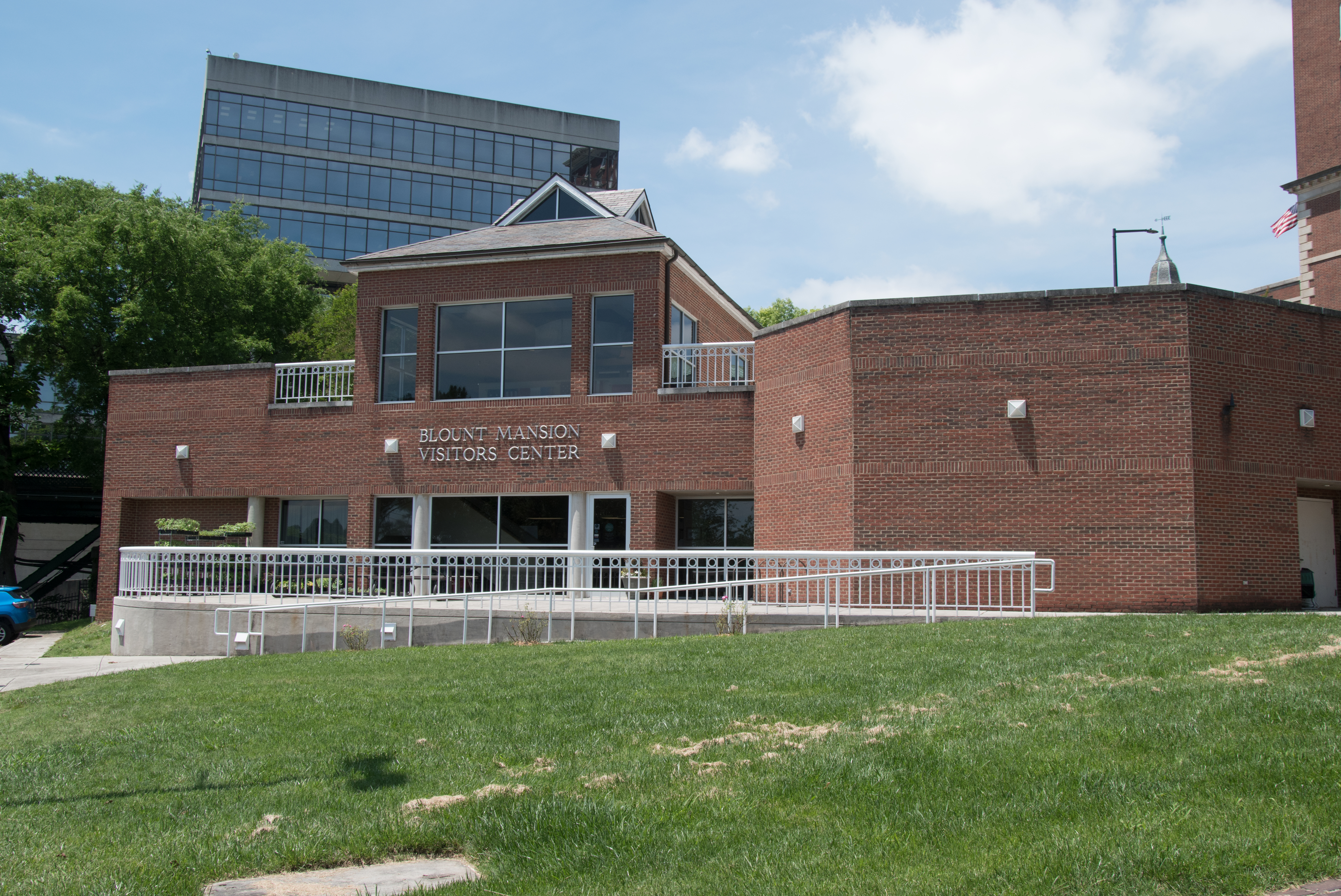
Museum visitor center

Blount Mansion occupies a lot in downtown Knoxville situated along Hill Avenue between Hill's intersection with Gay Street on the west and Hill's intersection with State Street on the east. The area rests atop an embankment overlooking the Volunteer Landing riverfront along the Tennessee River to the south. The Craighead-Jackson House, also managed by the Blount Mansion Association, is located across State Street to the east.

== History ==
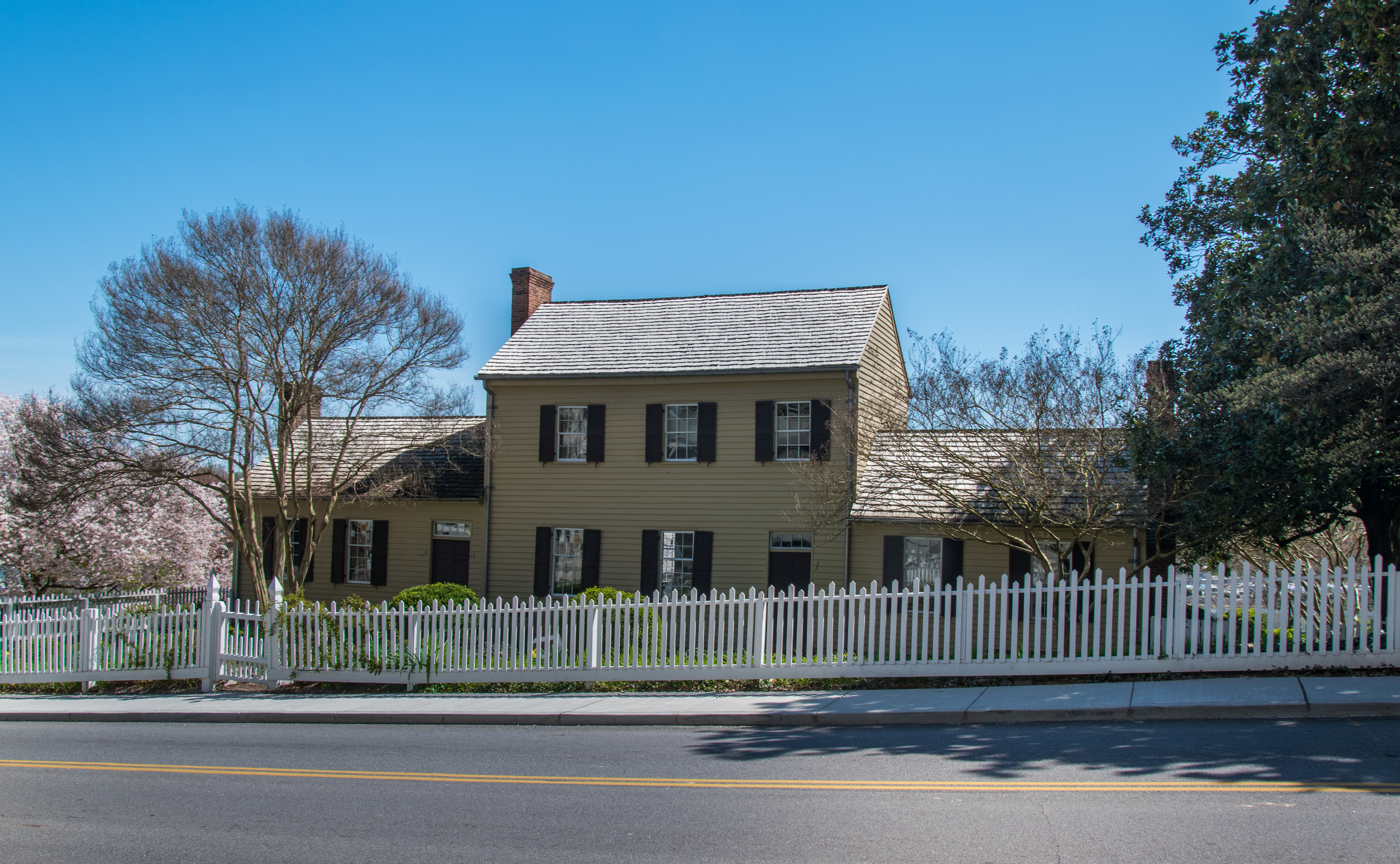
Blount Mansion's front facade, viewed from West Hill Avenue

The United States created the Territory South of the Ohio River, usually called the "Southwest Territory", in 1790. President George Washington appointed North Carolina businessman and land speculator William Blount as the territory's first governor. Blount initially governed from Rocky Mount (in the Tri-Cities area), but began searching for a permanent capital for the territory. After Blount selected White's Fort for the site of the capital, James White, the owner of the fort and adjacent lands, and his son-in-law Charles McClung drew up a grid of 64 half-acre lots that would eventually become the city of Knoxville, and in 1791 held a lottery for parties interested in purchasing a lot. Lot 18, the future site of Blount Mansion, was originally sold to John Carter. Blount purchased the lot from Carter in 1794, although it's believed they had a verbal agreement for sale of the lot much earlier, and thus construction of Blount Mansion began sometime around March 1792 when Blount relocated to Knoxville.

While the mansion was being built, the Blount family may have lived in a cabin atop Barbara Hill, now known as "The Hill" by University of Tennessee students. Blount's reasons for building an elaborate frame house on the frontier were twofold. First, the house would act as a capitol of the Southwest Territory, and thus would need to command the respect of visiting delegations. Second, Blount wanted to fulfill a promise he made to his wife, Mary Grainger Blount, to build a home comparable to their lavish North Carolina home. The first phase of construction was completed between 1795 and 1796, although work continued until well into the 19th century. The detached kitchen was likely completed in subsequent years. Blount's friend John Chisholm built Chisholm Tavern facing State Street along the south side of the lot in 1792. Andrew Jackson and John Sevier were frequent visitors to the mansion, and early guests included botanist André Michaux and various Cherokee and Chickasaw chiefs.

Blount transferred ownership of the mansion to his younger half-brother Willie Blount in 1797. Willie Blount deeded the mansion to Blount's son William Grainger Blount in 1818. The Blount family sold the mansion to the McClung family in 1825, and in 1845 Knoxville mayor Samuel B. Boyd had obtained ownership of the property. The Boyd family maintained ownership of the mansion until the early 20th century, renting it out to various private and commercial interests. The Boyds also made several additions to the mansion, including a large Victorian-style porch.

=== Restoration and preservation ===
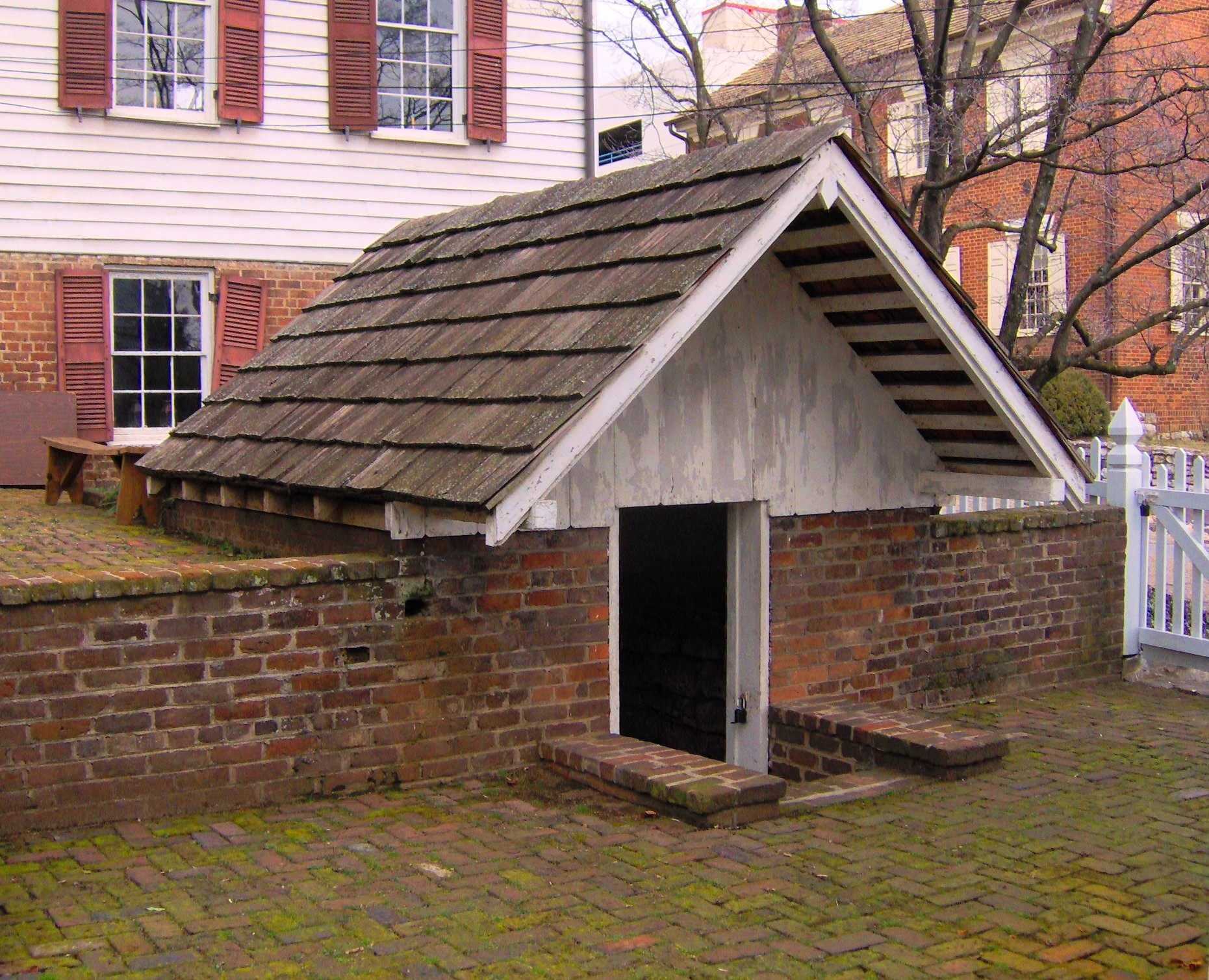
The Blount Mansion's "cooling room", used for food storage.

By 1925, Blount Mansion had badly deteriorated. Local developer B.H. Sprankle made plans to level the site and demolish the mansion and outbuildings to make room for a parking lot for the Andrew Johnson Hotel. In response, Mary Boyce Temple of the Bonnie Kate Chapter of the Daughters of the American Revolution purchased an option on the property, and the following year the Blount Mansion Association was chartered. By 1930, with the help of the DAR, the East Tennessee Historical Society, and the University of Tennessee, the BMA had raised enough money— just over $31,000— to purchase the mansion. The Association immediately initiated efforts to restore the house to its 18th-century condition, removing the Victorian additions and adding period furniture. In 1935 the Knoxville Garden Club assumed the maintenance of the grounds around the mansion.

In 1955, the BMA received a grant from the Tennessee Historical Commission that allowed them to restore Blount's office. The kitchen was rebuilt in 1960 after archaeologists discovered its original foundation. That same year, the discovery of a "vault" in the rear of the house reignited old rumors about an early escape tunnel that supposedly passed under the Tennessee River, but an investigation by the National Park Service determined the "vault" to be a cooling room used for storage of wine and perishable foods. In subsequent years, paint analysis on the exterior and interior walls determined the walls' original color, and the walls were repainted accordingly. Archaeological excavations in 1973 and 1984 uncovered other outbuilding foundations and an assemblage of late 18th-century artifacts. An architectural analysis in the 1990s identified six phases of construction, and suggested that the mansion didn't acquire its full form until around 1815.

== Design ==
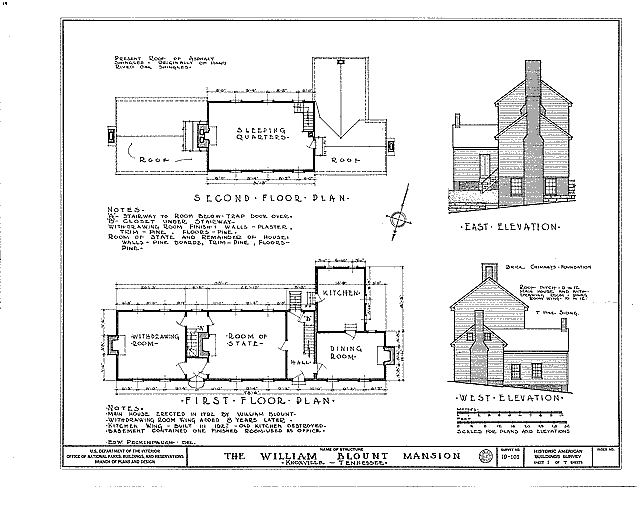
Blount Mansion floor plans & elevations, 1934

Blount Mansion is a frame and clapboard structure consisting of a two-story central block and one-story wings on the east and west ends. The first floor of the main structure contains a parlor, dining room and hallway with a quarter-turn staircase. The second story contains two bedrooms. The west wing contains a single bedroom. The east wing contains a drawing room, and has a basement accessible by stairs and a trap door. Chimneys are located on the east end of the main block and at the outside ends of both wings. The frame was probably built using locally cut timber, but the house's finished woodwork, paneling, flooring and weatherboarding materials were shipped from North Carolina.

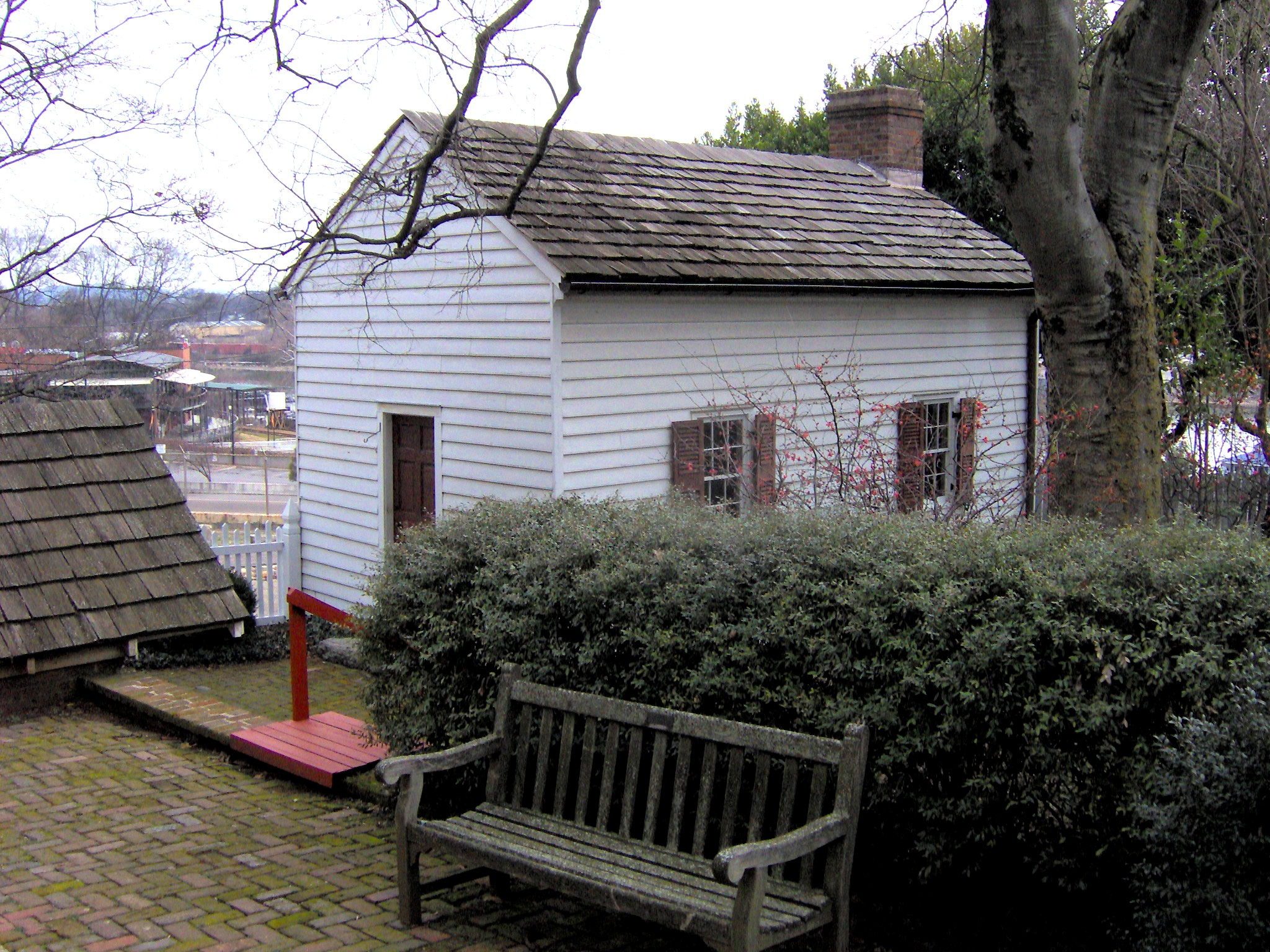
Governor's Office

Blount's office, often referred to as the Governor's Office, stands behind the west wing of the mansion. The office is a one-story frame-and-clapboard structure with a brick chimney on its south side, and a pair of sash windows with louvered blinds along the east and west walls. The interior includes wide-board paneling and a carved mantel.

The mansion's kitchen had originally been a detached structure located behind the east wing. At an unknown date, this kitchen was dismantled and its materials used to construct an attached rear-wing kitchen. In 1958, archaeologists discovered the foundation of the original kitchen. The rear-wing kitchen was then dismantled and used to rebuild the detached kitchen on its original foundation behind the east wing. The kitchen has a design similar to the office.

== See also ==
- Alexander Bishop House
- James Park House
- Ramsey House
- Statesview
- History of Knoxville, Tennessee
- List of National Historic Landmarks in Tennessee
- List of the oldest buildings in Tennessee
- National Register of Historic Places listings in Knox County, Tennessee
