= Craighead–Jackson House =

Historic house in Tennessee, United States

- U.S. National Register of Historic Places
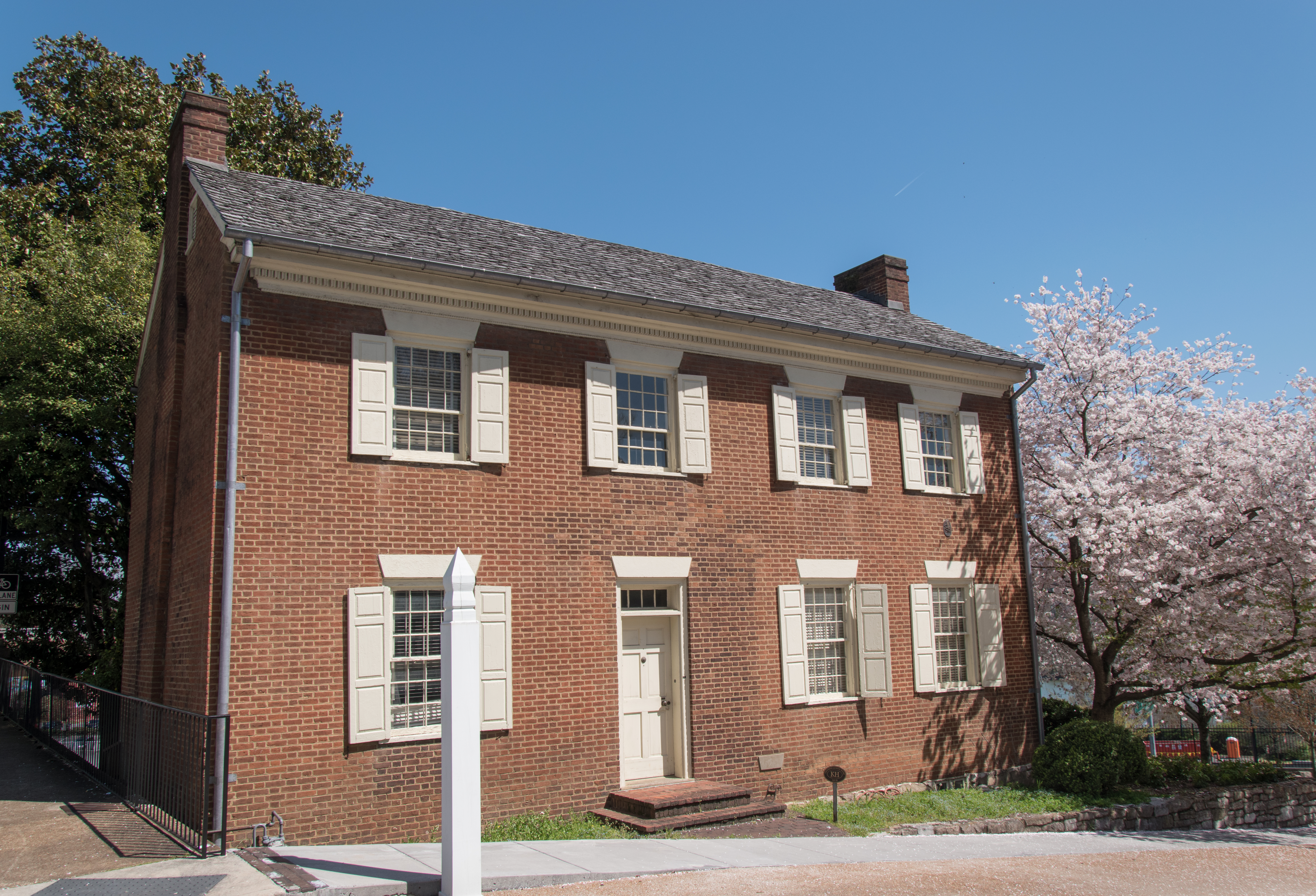
- Craighead–Jackson House, viewed from the west

- Location within Tennessee Location within the United States
- Interactive map showing the location of Craighead-Jackson House
- Location: 1000 State St. Knoxville, Tennessee
- Coordinates: 35°57′40″N 83°54′51″W
- Built: 1818
- Architect: John Craighead
- Architectural style: Federal
- NRHP reference No.: 73001801
- Added to NRHP: March 20, 1973

The Craighead–Jackson House is a historic two-story, brick house in Knoxville, in the U.S. state of Tennessee. The home was constructed by John Craighead in 1818 across the street from the William Blount Mansion. The house is on the National Register of Historic Places.

The Craighead family lived in the house until 1855, when it was sold to William Swan. Swan, who later was a member of the Confederate Congress, soon sold the house to George Jackson. The George Jackson family then lived in the home until around 1885. The state of Tennessee and the City of Knoxville purchased the property in 1957 and heavily modified it, before transferring it to the Blount Mansion Association in 1962.

From 1966 to the mid-1990s, the house served as the Blount Mansion visitor center and offices, until it was replaced in this function by a purpose-built visitors center. Subsequently, it was used as archival storage and for occasional special events. In September 2020, a $75,000 grant was obtained to allow for a restoration expected to take 12–18 months, with completion predicted in the fall of 2021.

== Location ==
The Craighead–Jackson House is situated at the corner of West Hill Avenue and State Street in downtown Knoxville. The house's back porch overlooks the confluence of First Creek and the Tennessee River to the southeast. The river's Volunteer Landing waterfront lies at the base of the embankment to the south and southwest.

== History ==
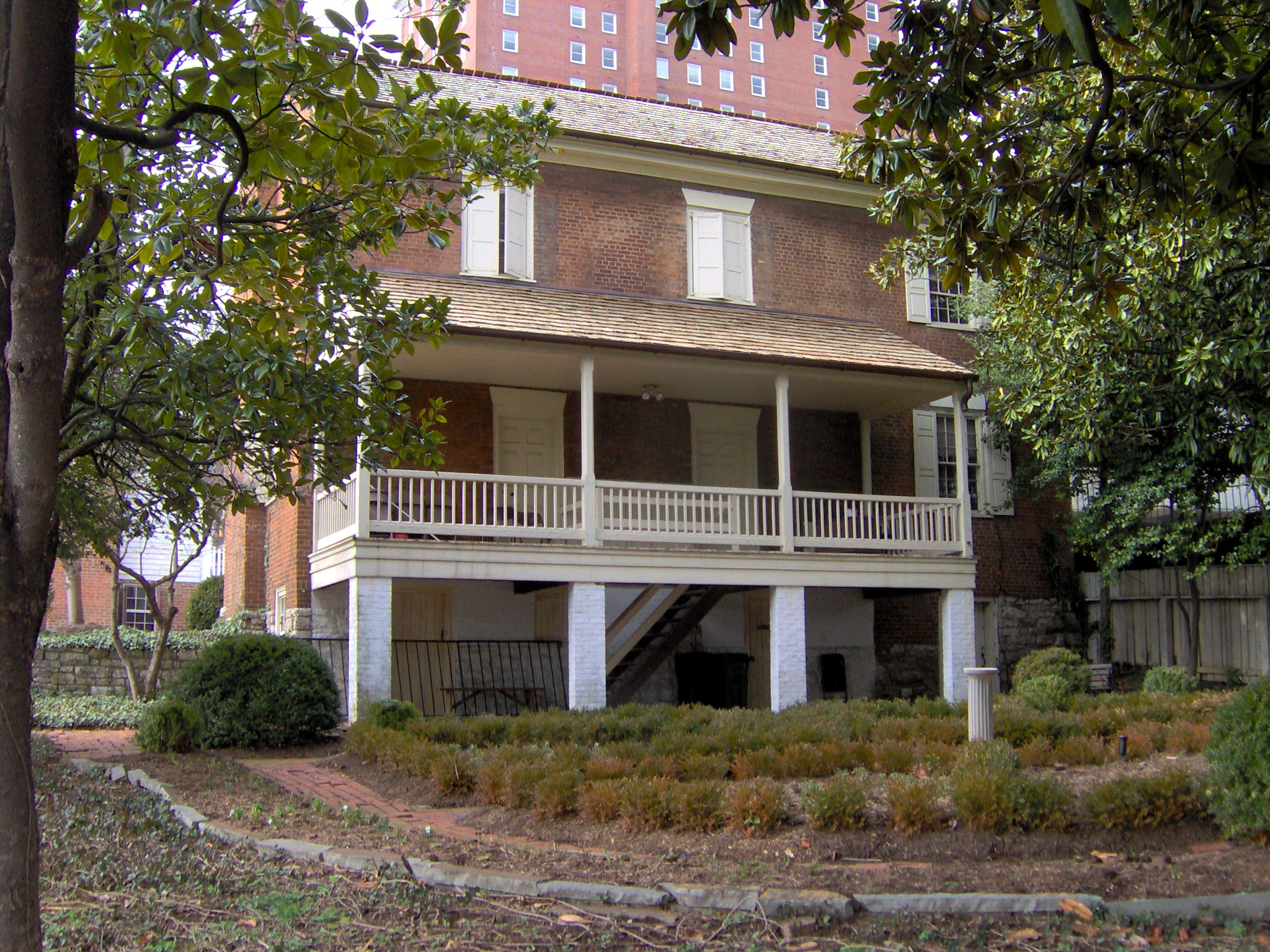
Rear facade of the Craighead–Jackson House

After William Blount selected White's Fort as the capital of the newly created Southwest Territory in 1791, the fort's owner, James White, and his son-in-law Charles McClung drew up a grid of 64 half-acre lots that would eventually become the core of the city of Knoxville. The Craighead–Jackson House is located on what was originally designated "Lot 15" on McClung's grid. Lot 15 was sold to William Blount in October 1791, although Blount eventually disposed of the lot and instead built his mansion on the adjacent lot (Lot 18) which he purchased from John Carter in 1794. Tennessee historian Stanley Folmsbee suggested that the Blount family's temporary cabin (where they lived while the mansion was being built) may have been located at Lot 15, rather than on the Hill, as local history has long dictated.

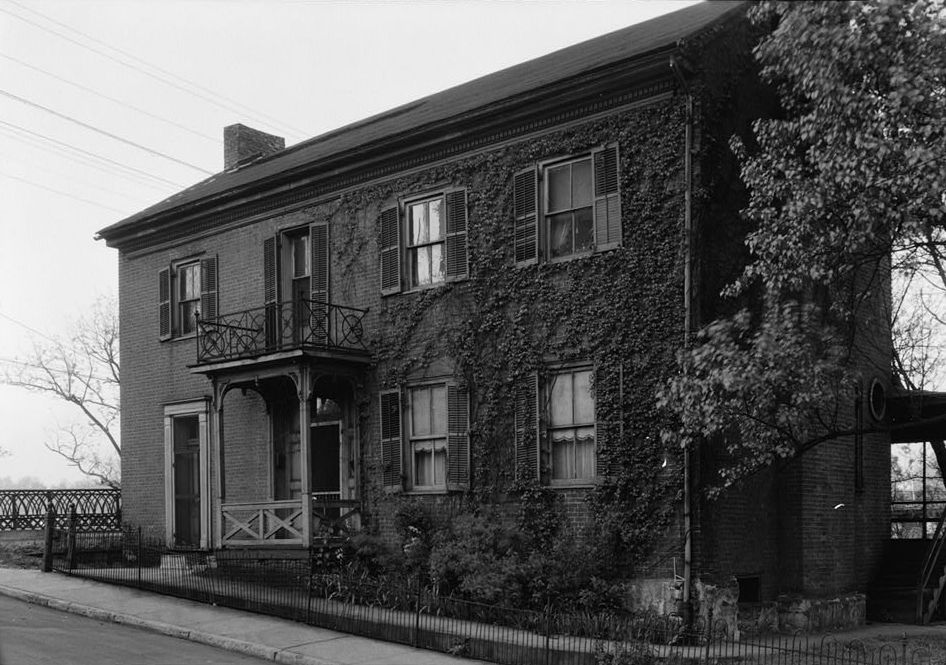
The Craighead–Jackson House, photographed by the Historic American Buildings Survey in 1934

John Craighead (1783–1826) purchased Lot 15 in 1818 and built the current house. Craighead served as a Knoxville city alderman in 1824, was an elder of the First Presbyterian Church, and is buried in the First Presbyterian Church Cemetery. George Jackson, a Knoxville physician, obtained the house in the late 1850s. According to a local legend, the house is haunted by the ghost of one of Jackson's servants, who burned to death after her skirt caught fire while working in the house's kitchen.

In the 1950s, the Blount Mansion Association, which had restored Blount Mansion in the 1930s, expressed interest in acquiring the Craighead–Jackson House. In 1957, the house was offered to them for $15,000. The state of Tennessee offered to pay half the cost if a Knoxville resident or residents would pay the other half. The City of Knoxville subsequently paid the other half, and in 1962 transferred the house to the Blount Mansion Association with the stipulation that it be used and that restoration begin within six months. The Association set up a display of pioneer relics at the house in the late 1960s, and used the house for its offices until it moved to a new office on Gay Street.

== Design ==
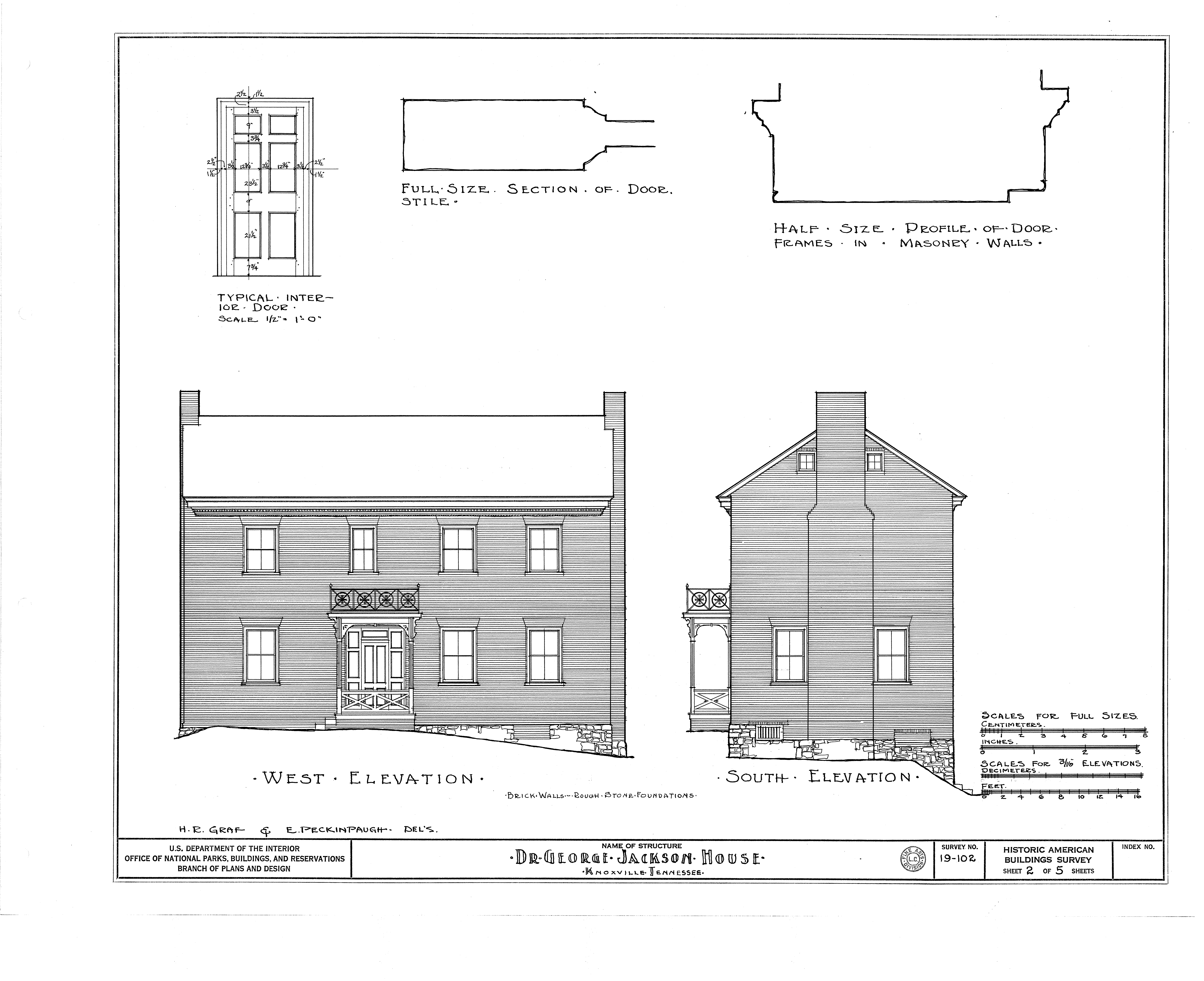
Architecture planning

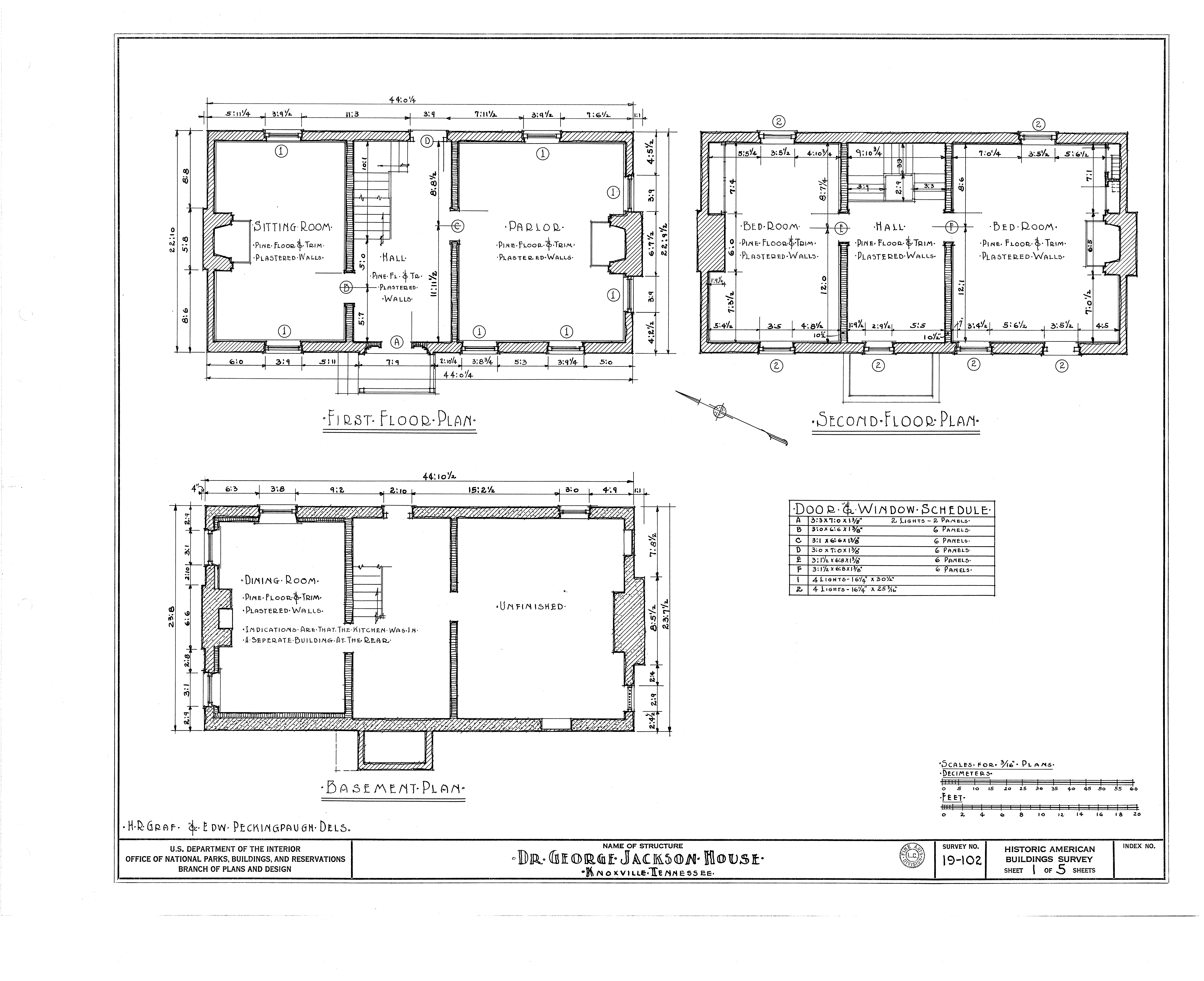
Floor planning

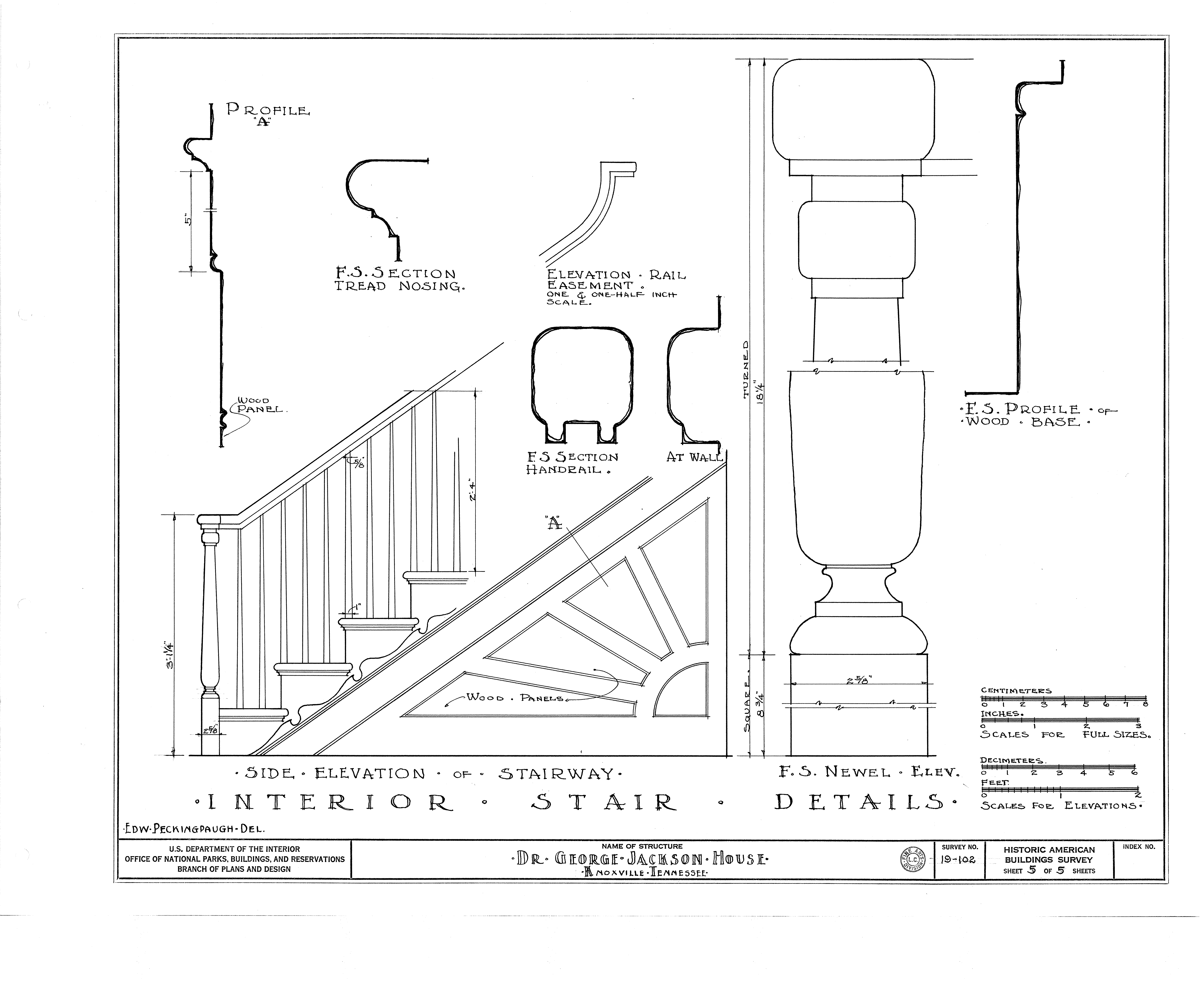
Interior design

The Craighead–Jackson is a white brick house consisting of two stories and a basement. The first story consists of a hallway that spans the center of the house from east to west and contains the house's two main entrances and staircase, with a sitting room on the north side of the house and a parlor on the south side. The second story has two bedrooms, with the south side bedroom being slightly larger than the north side bedroom. The basement has a dining room and a large "unfinished" room. Chimneys are located at both the north and south ends of the house. A small porch graces the door along the front (west) facade of the house, and a larger covered porch is located at the rear of the house.

== See also ==
- Alexander Bishop House
- Chisholm Tavern (Knoxville)
- James Park House
- Ramsey House (Knoxville, Tennessee)
- Statesview
