= Chisholm Tavern (Knoxville) =

Historic building

Coordinates: 35°57′41″N 83°54′52″W

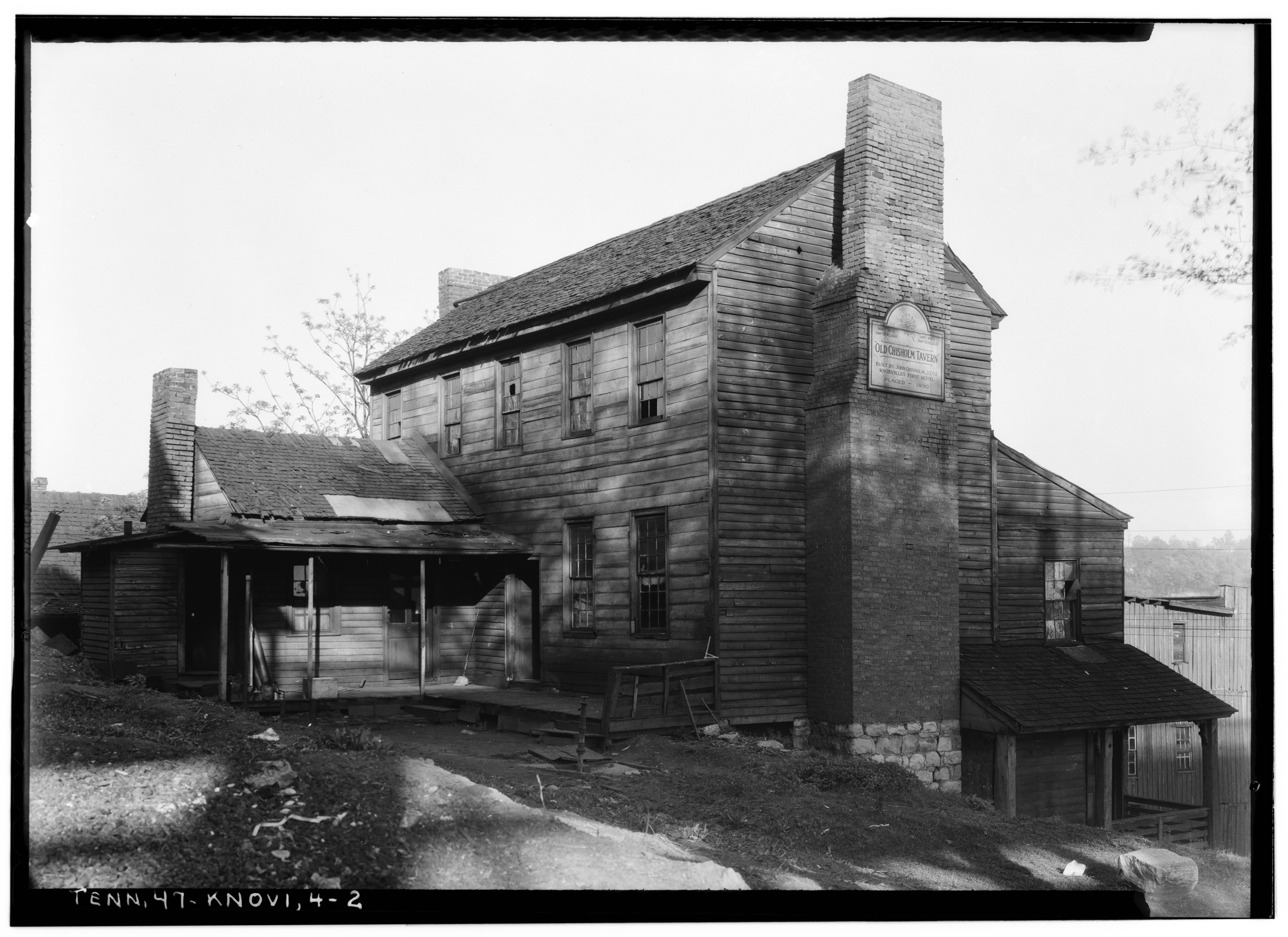
Chisholm Tavern, photographed by the Historic American Buildings Survey in 1934.

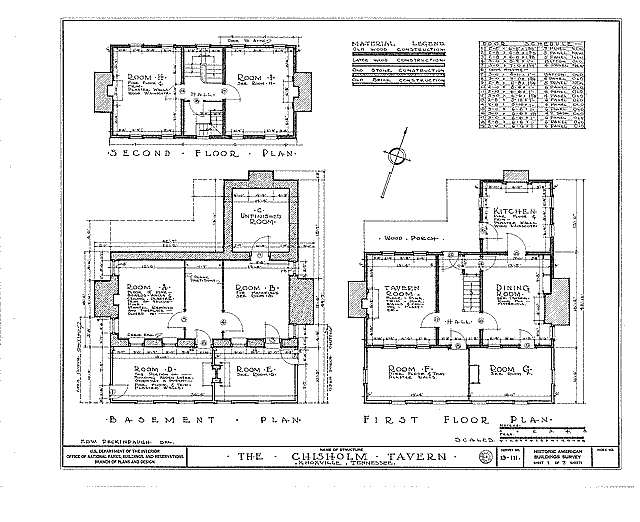
Floors Plans of 1792 Chisholm Tavern, Knoxville.

Chisholm Tavern was a historic building at Front and Gay streets in Knoxville, Tennessee. It stood on the same block as William Blount Mansion. Construction was completed cn. 1792, and it remained for almost 200 years until it was demolished as a part of urban renewal in 1966. A historic marker was placed at its location by the Blount Park Association in 1967.

Chisholm Tavern was originally constructed as a home for Captain John D. Chisholm, who came to Knoxville (then known as James White's Fort) with Governor William Blount in 1790. Captain Chisholm purchased a half-acre lot on Front Street, and is believed to have used the same architect who designed the Blount Mansion. Both homes utilized frame construction with similar detailing. The home became the frontier community's first tavern, which in that era included both hotel and dining facilities. It eventually declined until, by the time of the Great Depression, the Historic American Buildings Survey documented it as being occupied by "slum tenants."

The federal survey notes the following: The two story frame house was built on a steep slope. At each end and on the kitchen ell are brick chimneys of the freestanding variety. The interior is typically of the Revolutionary Period: sunburst mantel in the dining room, cupboards with scrolled shelves in the dining room, and dog-eared trim throughout the house. The triangular space beneath the main stairs is paneled with radiating rails.

Before Chisholm Tavern was demolished, there were discussions as to whether the Tennessee State Legislature may have met there when Knoxville was the state capital. During the formative years, the legislature is believed to have met at multiple convenient locations in the city, but no conclusive evidence had survived that they had met in this tavern.

== See also ==
- Alexander Bishop House
- Craighead-Jackson House
- James Park House
- Ramsey House (Knoxville, Tennessee)
- Statesview
