= Ramsey House (Knox County, Tennessee) =

Historic house in Tennessee, United States

- U.S. National Register of Historic Places
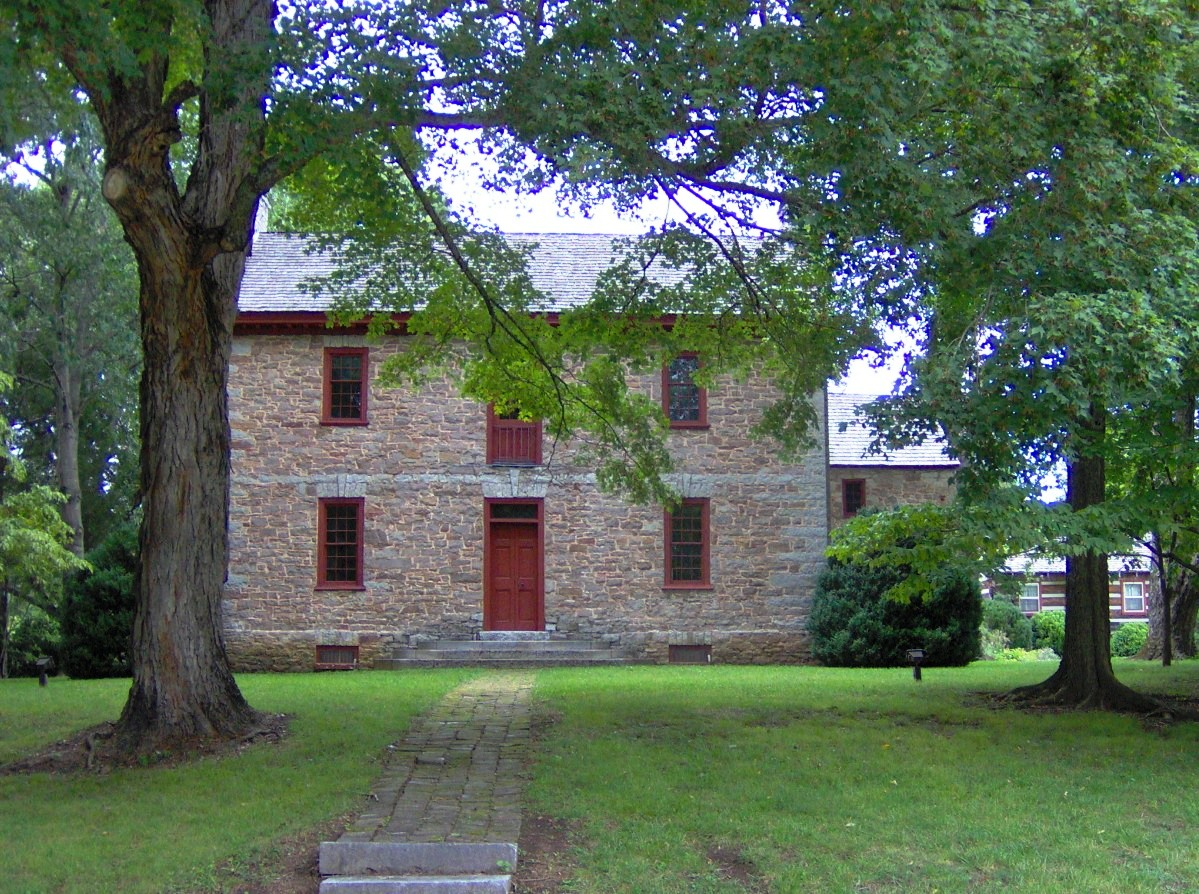
- The Ramsey House
- Location: SE of Knoxville on Thorngrove Pike
- Nearest city: Knoxville, Tennessee
- Coordinates: 35.9667°N 83.8232°W
- Built: 1797
- Architect: Thomas Hope
- NRHP reference No.: 69000180
- Added to NRHP: December 23, 1969

The Ramsey House is a two-story stone house in Knox County, Tennessee, United States. Also known as Swan Pond, the house was constructed in 1797 by English architect Thomas Hope for Colonel Francis Alexander Ramsey (1764–1820), whose family operated a plantation at the site until the U.S. Civil War. In 1969, the house was added to the National Register of Historic Places for its architecture and its role in the region's early 19th-century history.

Francis Alexander Ramsey arrived in what is now Greene County in 1783, and shortly thereafter made a surveying trip down the Holston River, where he first identified the future site of the Ramsey House. Throughout the 1780s, he served as an official of the fledgling State of Franklin, and later served in various capacities in the governments of the Southwest Territory and the State of Tennessee. Ramsey's children included early Knoxville mayor, W. B. A. Ramsey, and early Tennessee historian and businessman, J. G. M. Ramsey, both of whom occupied the Ramsey House at various times. Due to their Confederate sympathies, the Ramseys fled Knoxville when the Union Army occupied the city during the Civil War, and the family sold the house in 1866.

The Knoxville Chapter of the Association for the Preservation of Tennessee Antiquities (APTA) purchased the Ramsey House in 1952, and currently maintains the house and grounds as a museum.

== Location ==
The Ramsey House is situated in a broad valley just over a mile east of Forks-of-the-River, where the Holston River and French Broad River join to form the Tennessee River. The property managed by APTA, which includes the Ramsey House, a visitor center, and gardens, covers 101.5 acres (41.1 ha). The house and grounds are located at 2614 Thorngrove Pike, just off John Sevier Highway (TN-168).

== History ==
=== Early history and development ===
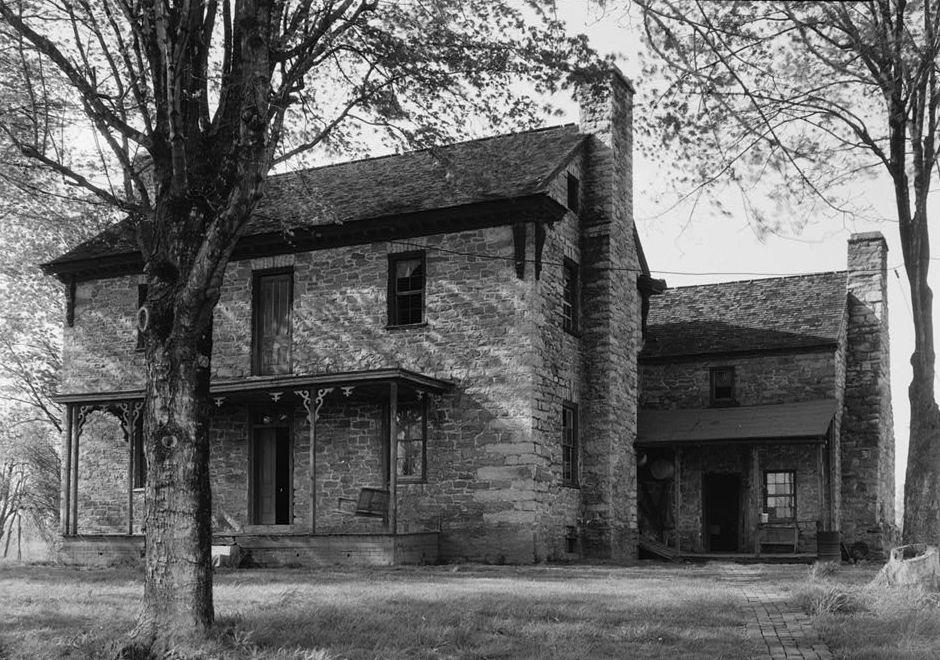
The Ramsey House, photographed by the Historic American Buildings Survey in 1934

Francis Alexander Ramsey was born in Pennsylvania in 1764 to Scotch-Irish parents, and moved to Greene County, Tennessee in 1783. That year, North Carolina (which controlled what is now East Tennessee) opened up Cherokee lands north of the French Broad to settlement, and Ramsey, James White, and several other explorers began making excursions into what is now the Knoxville area in search of new land. On one such expedition, Ramsey discovered a game-rich beaver dam pond which he named "Swan Pond." He was issued a grant for Swan Pond and its surrounding land in November 1786.

Ramsey's rise to prominence in the failed State of Franklin (1784–1788) kept him occupied for the remainder of the decade, and it wasn't until 1792— after he had been appointed clerk for the newly formed Southwest Territory— that he decided to move to Swan Pond, which lay just outside the territory's new capital at Knoxville. Ramsey chose to build his new house on a peninsula in the pond, although due to malaria concerns, he was forced to drain the pond before the house was constructed. London-trained architect Thomas Hope designed the house, and probably built it between 1795 and 1797.

In the years after its completion, the Ramsey House came to be part of a sizeable plantation. Upon Ramsey's death in 1820, the house passed to his eldest son, W.B.A. Ramsey. In 1840, W.B.A Ramsey sold the house to his brother, J.G.M. Ramsey (1797–1884), who had taken an active interest in the region's history, and had built a large mansion nearby to the east, known as "Mecklenburg," overlooking the fork of both the French Broad River with the Holston River and the no longer extant Lebanon In The Fork Presbyterian Church, along the nearby and present-day Asbury Road. Mecklenburg was noted for its 4,000-volume library containing numerous 18th-century documents pertaining to the settlement of Tennessee. In 1857, J.G.M. Ramsey gave the Ramsey House to his son, also named Francis Alexander Ramsey, as a wedding present.

=== The Civil War ===
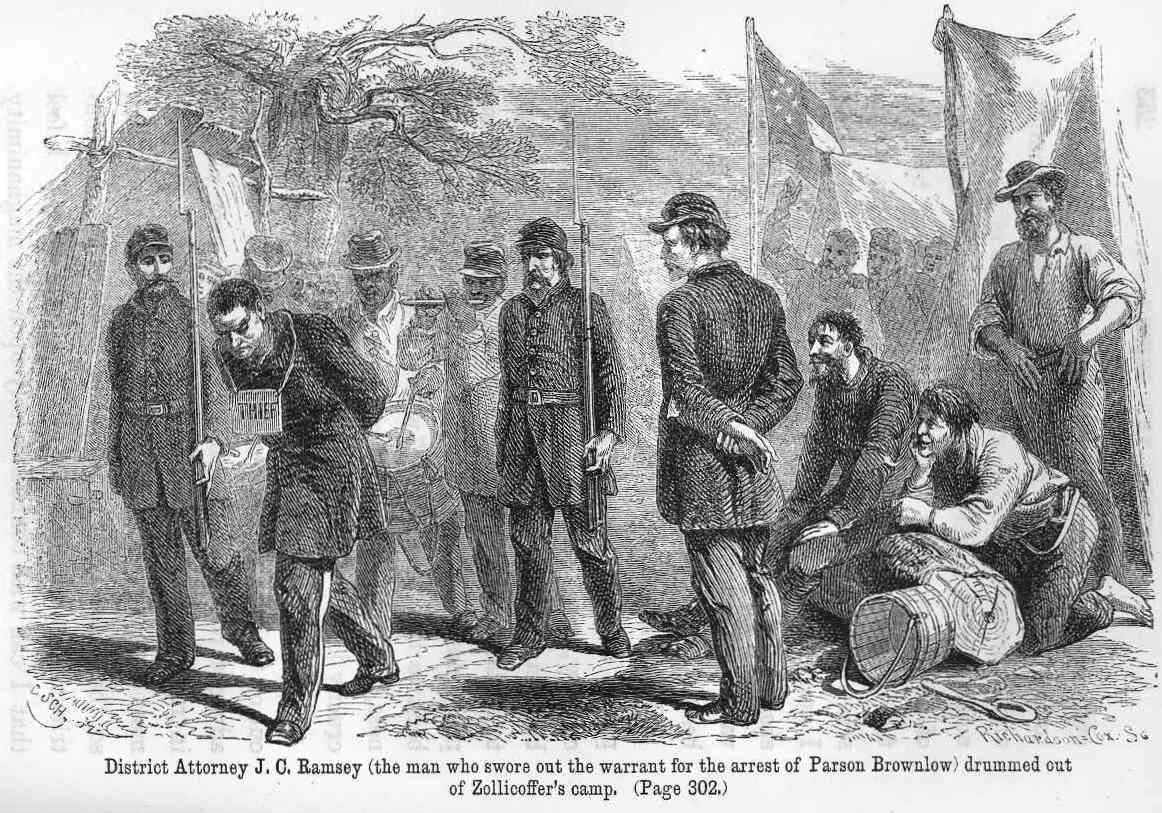
Parson Brownlow's depiction of his rival, John Crozier Ramsey, being drummed out of the Confederate Army

J.G.M. Ramsey played an active role in the economic development of East Tennessee. He helped establish the region's first medical society, served as president of the Bank of East Tennessee, and fought to bring railroads to the region. In the late 1850s, as one of the directors of the Bank of East Tennessee, Ramsey ran afoul of Knoxville's fiery newspaper publisher, William G. "Parson" Brownlow. Brownlow relentlessly accused the bank's directors, who along with Ramsey included Ramsey's brothers-in-law, John H. Crozier and A.R. Crozier, of defrauding the bank's clients. He also accused Ramsey's son, John Crozier Ramsey (1824–1868), whom Brownlow called "a few degrees removed from an idiot," of creating false pension funds for employees. His continued attacks helped Horace Maynard defeat John Crozier Ramsey for the district's Congressional seat in 1859.

At the outbreak of the Civil War, the Ramseys, who were states' rights Democrats, sided with the Confederacy, drawing them further into conflict with Brownlow, who was a radical anti-secessionist. In December 1861, John Crozier Ramsey, who had been appointed Knox County's district attorney, had Brownlow jailed on charges of conspiring to burn railroad bridges in East Tennessee. The Ramseys demanded Brownlow be hanged, but the Confederate Army, fearing a public backlash, released him. Due in part to Brownlow's influence, J.G.M. Ramsey's Mecklenburg mansion— with its invaluable library— was burned when the Union Army occupied Knoxville in 1863.

With Mecklenburg in ruins, the Ramseys, who had fled to South Carolina on approach of the Union Army in 1863, decided not to return to Knoxville. The Ramsey House was sold to William Spurgien in 1866, and afterward began to deteriorate. J.G.M. Ramsey eventually moved back to Knoxville in the 1870s, and was deeply saddened at the state of the Ramsey House. His autobiography, written during this period, included a poem lamenting the house's decline.

=== Preservation ===
In 1927, the Bonnie Kate Chapter of the Daughters of the American Revolution placed a marker at the Ramsey House commemorating the site as the birthplace of J.G.M. Ramsey, whose book, the Annals of Tennessee, had become an important work on the state's early history. In the following decade, the house was documented by the Historic American Buildings Survey. In 1952, APTA's Knoxville Chapter purchased the house with the help of state and local governments, and began restoring it. The roof and windows were replaced, and an old log cabin was moved to the site to represent the cabin used by the Ramseys in the 1790s while the main house was being built.

== Design ==
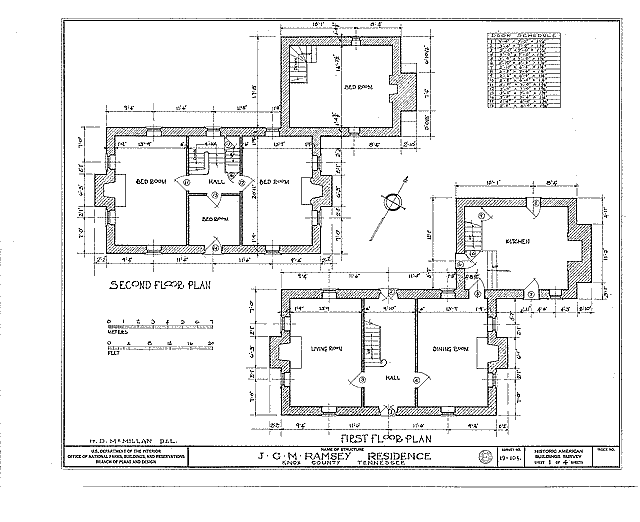
Floor plan of the Ramsey House

The Ramsey House is a two-story Late Georgian house, built primarily of local pink marble with blueish-gray limestone trim. This blueish-gray limestone forms a "belt" around the house about midway up the walls, and also forms the house's four corners. The house has a "dogtrot" kitchen wing, with the southwest corner of the kitchen wing joining the northeast corner of the main house. Exterior ornamentation includes hand-carved cornices and window arches consisting of nine narrow stones each.

The house's interior follows a central hall floor plan. The front door opens into a hallway, with a library/parlor room to the left and a dining room to the right. The second floor has two bedrooms, a bonus room, and a door which used to lead to the roof of the porch (the porch is no longer there). The kitchen wing is also two stories, although there is no passage from the second story of the main wing to the second story of the kitchen wing. The house has three chimneys— one at both ends of the main wing, and one at the end of the kitchen wing— and six fireplaces in all. The interior has been outfitted with period furniture, most notably two Chippendale chairs given to Francis Alexander Ramsey and his wife, Peggy, as a wedding present.

== See also ==
- Alexander Bishop House
- Blount Mansion
- Craighead-Jackson House
- James Park House
- Statesview
- History of Knoxville, Tennessee

== Resources ==
- Isenhour, Judith Clayton. Knoxville - A Pictorial History. (Donning, 1978), page 20.
- Rothrock, Mary U., editor. The French Broad-Holston Country: A History of Knox County, Tennessee. (Knox County Historical Committee; East Tennessee Historical Society, 1946).
- Knoxville: Fifty Landmarks. (Knoxville: The Knoxville Heritage Committee of the Junior League of Knoxville, 1976), p. 9.
