= Ebenezer Mill =

- U.S. National Register of Historic Places
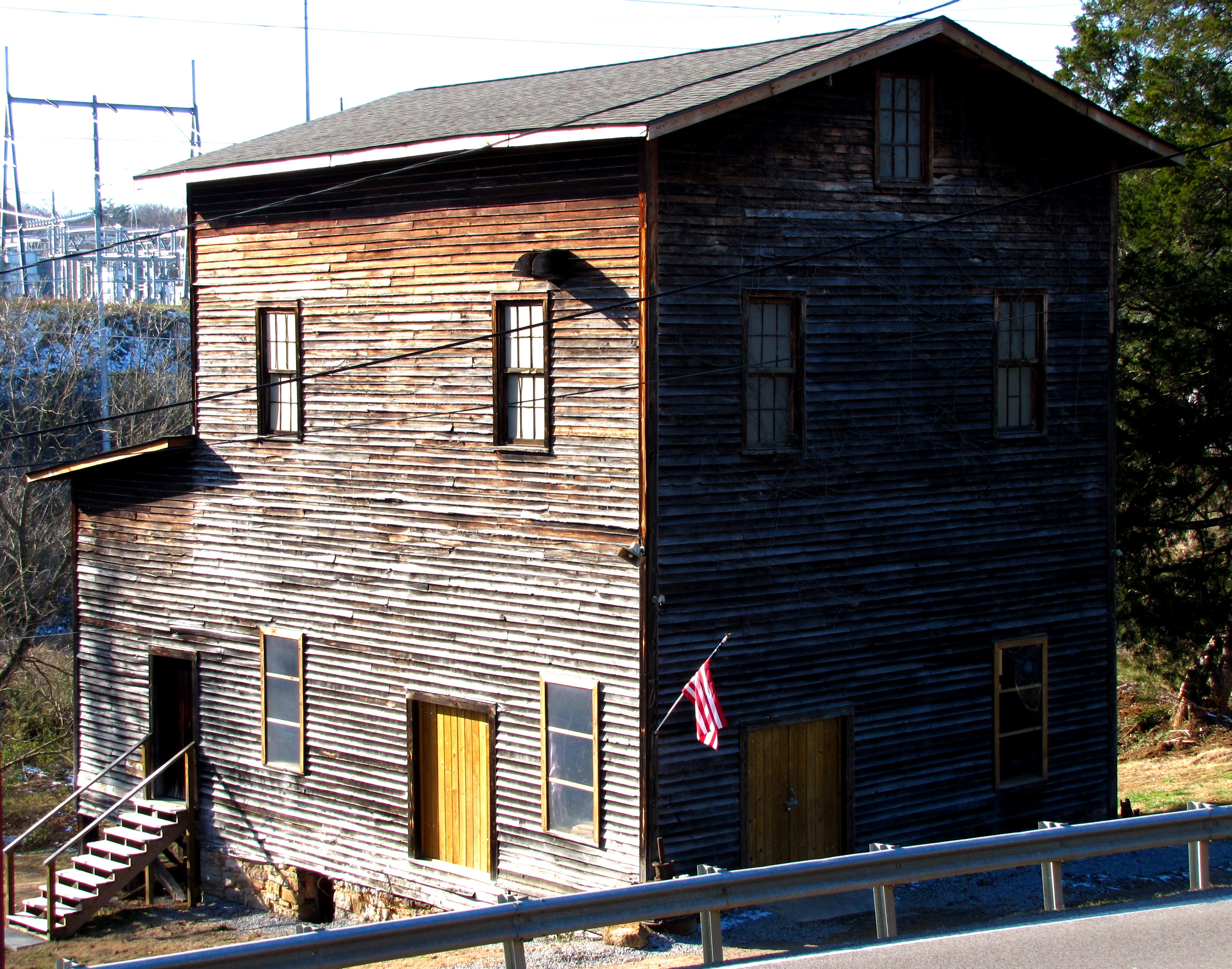

- Location within Tennessee
- Nearest city: 409 Ebenezer Road, Knoxville, Tennessee
- Coordinates: 35°54′19″N 84°4′25″W
- Built: 1870
- NRHP reference No.: 87001037
- Added to NRHP: June 25, 1987

Ebenezer Mill is a mill located in Knoxville, Tennessee. It was constructed as a turbine mill to grind corn and wheat, and later modified for use as a saw mill. The mill was added to the National Register of Historic Places in 1987 as an example of a late-19th century gristmill.

The mill sits on the banks of Ten Mile Creek (originally Sinking Creek) on the site of what was once the "Mansion Mill," a smaller gristmill built c. 1835 for the McClung estate. The Mansion Mill was replaced by the current Ebenezer Mill c. 1870. The Ebenezer Mill was severely damaged by a flood in 1942 and rebuilt in a more modern style, though much of the original machinery is still intact.
