= Thomas Hope (architect) =

American architect (1757-1820)

- Born: December 25, 1757; Kent, England
- Died: October 4, 1820 (aged 62); Boatyard (Kingsport), Tennessee, US
- Occupations: architect, house joiner
- Years active: 1788–1820
- Notable work: Izard Mansion (Charleston); Ramsey House (Knoxville); Statesview (Knoxville); Trafalgar (Knoxville); Joseph Strong House (Knoxville); Rotherwood (Kingsport)
- Style: Georgian, Federal
- Spouse: Elizabeth Large
- Children: Martha Hope; Thomas Hope; David Large Hope; Esther Hope; Ralph Izard Hope; John Hope; Samuel Ramsey Hope
- Parent(s): John and Mary Hope

Thomas Hope (December 25, 1757 – October 4, 1820) was an English-born American architect and house joiner, active primarily in Knoxville, Tennessee. Trained in London, Hope moved to Knoxville in 1795 where he designed and built several of the city's earliest houses. At least two houses built by Hope—the Ramsey House (1797) in east Knoxville and Statesview (ca. 1806) in West Knoxville— are still standing and have been listed on the National Register of Historic Places.

== Biography ==
Hope was born in Kent, England, in 1757 and learned the house construction trade in London. During the 1780s, he moved to Charleston, South Carolina, where he had been hired to build a house for South Carolina planter Ralph Izard. This house stood on Broad Street in Charleston for several decades. During the early 1790s, Hope lived in Cheraw, South Carolina, where he married his wife, Elizabeth Large, in 1793. Hope then moved to Knoxville, which at the time was the capital of the Southwest Territory, in 1795.

Hope's first project in Knoxville was the Ramsey House, or Swan Pond, a two-story Georgian-style house completed in 1797. Hope found ample work in Knoxville, a burgeoning frontier town in need of professional builders. In the decade after completing the Ramsey House, Hope built a residence known as "Trafalgar" for planter John Kain, overlooking the Holston River in Knox County. Around 1806, Hope completed the Federal-style Statesview for surveyor Charles McClung in what is now West Knoxville. In 1812, Hope built a house, later known as "Maison de Sante," for Knoxville physician Joseph C. Strong, which stood at the corner of State Street and Cumberland Avenue. In addition to house construction, Hope co-founded a carpenters' guild in Knoxville in 1801.

The original design of the James Park House in Knoxville, built in approximately 1812, is sometimes attributed to Hope. In 1816, Hope received several payments from Thomas Humes, builder of the Lamar House Hotel, suggesting that Hope may have played a role in the hotel's original design (although there is little else to support this). Hope's last project was the Rotherwood Mansion, built for Presbyterian clergyman Frederick Augustus Ross near Kingsport, Tennessee. After Hope's death in 1820, his son oversaw Rotherwood's completion.

== Style ==
Hope's influences included English architect Christopher Wren and contemporary American architect Charles Bulfinch. Many of Hope's designs were inspired by William Pain's 1781 book, The Builder's Golden Rule, which Hope carried with him on his various projects. Hope typically used a mix of Georgian and Federal architectural styles, depending on his clients' needs.

=== Buildings ===
Hope is known to have built the following:

- The Ralph Izard House, c.1788, on Broad Street in Charleston, South Carolina; no longer standing.
- The Ramsey House, or Swan Pond, in East Knoxville, completed 1797. Built of locally quarried Tennessee marble and limestone around a central hall floor plan; contains hand-carved cornices. The house is now a museum.
- Statesview, c.1806 in the Ebenezer community (now part of West Knoxville). Designed in the Federal style, this house's original layout was altered somewhat after it was damaged by fire in 1823. The house is now a private residence.
- Trafalgar, c.1806 along the Holston River in Knox County; no longer standing.
- Joseph Strong House, c.1812 in Knoxville; demolished in 1971 to make way for highway construction.
- Rotherwood, 1820 in Boatyard, Tennessee (now Kingsport). This mansion burned in 1865 and was replaced shortly thereafter by the current Rotherwood Mansion.

== Furniture ==
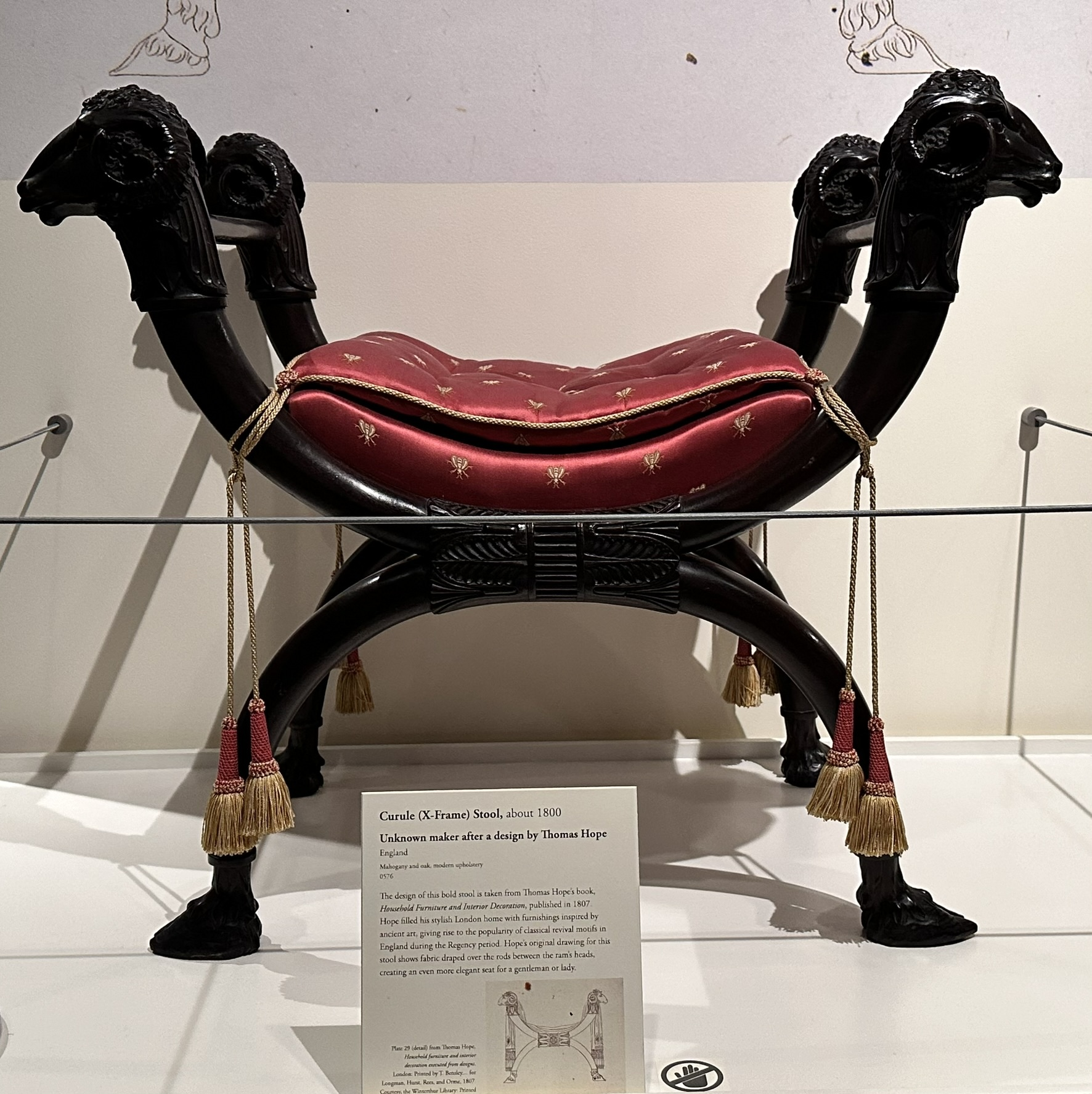
A curule stool, built around 1800 based on a design by Hope, on display in the Museum of the Shenandoah Valley, Winchester, Virginia

Hope supplied furniture for many of the houses he constructed. A ledger owned by War Department agent David Henley shows that Hope also supplied furniture for Tellico agent Silas Dinsmore in the mid-1790s. In his Autobiography, historian J. G. M. Ramsey, the son of Francis Alexander Ramsey for whom the Ramsey House was built, states that Hope designed a bookcase and desk for the house's library. Since then, several furniture pieces have been attributed to Hope, including a desk and bookcase once owned by early Knox County settler David Campbell.

While Hope supplied furniture for some of his patrons, whether he made the furniture pieces or merely acquired them is disputed. Furniture historian Ann McPherson states that certain pieces attributed to Hope contain rococo elements unlikely to be used by Hope, and points out the pieces' resemblance to a cabinet-making style that originated in the Winchester, Virginia, area in the late 18th century.

== Legacy ==
The Ramsey House and Statesview are the only two surviving structures known to have been built by Thomas Hope. The James Park House, which still stands in downtown Knoxville, is sometimes attributed to Hope, although its original design has been modified numerous times. The destruction of the Joseph Strong House in 1971 sparked an outcry from preservationists and was one of the events that led to the establishment of the Knoxville-area preservation group Knox Heritage.

In 1868 Hope's great-grandsons, David James Hope and John W. Hope, opened Hope Brothers Jewelry which operated out of a shop on Gay Street into the 20th century. In 1897 the Hope brothers erected a 12-foot (3.7 m) street clock in front of their store that remained a landmark in downtown Knoxville for over a century. The Hope Brothers Jewelry Store became Kimball's Jewelry in 1933, and in 2004 Kimball's relocated to West Knoxville and took the Hope clock with them. The city of Knoxville erected a new street clock to replace the Hope clock in 2007.

In 1924, Hope's great-great-grandson, Albert Guinn Hope (1869–1955), built a house, "Hopecote," on what is now part of the University of Tennessee campus in Knoxville. The house includes a cupboard attributed to Thomas Hope. In 2012, Hopecote was added to the National Register of Historic Places.

== See also ==
- George Franklin Barber
- Baumann family (architects)
- R. F. Graf
