= James Park House =

Historic house in Tennessee, United States

- U.S. National Register of Historic Places
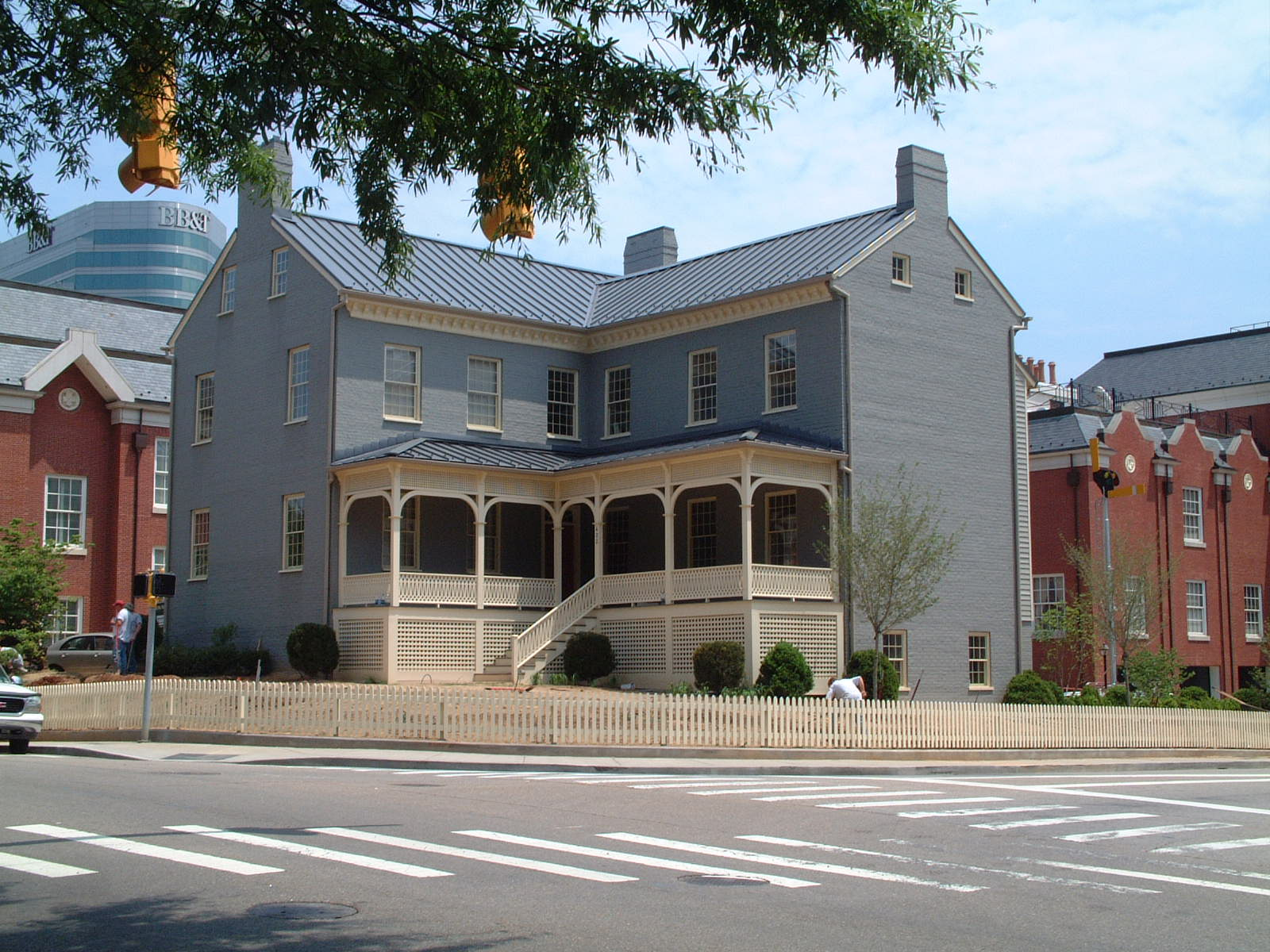
- James Park House, pictured in 2007, after restoration
- Location: 422 W. Cumberland Avenue; Knoxville, Tennessee
- Coordinates: 35°57′42″N 83°55′7″W
- Built: 1812
- NRHP reference No.: 72001242
- Added to NRHP: October 18, 1972

The James Park House is a historic house located at 422 West Cumberland Avenue in Knoxville, Tennessee, United States. The house's foundation was built by Governor John Sevier in the 1790s, and the house itself was built by Knoxville merchant and mayor, James Park (1770–1853), in 1812, making it the second-oldest building in Downtown Knoxville after Blount Mansion. The house is listed on the National Register of Historic Places, and currently serves as the headquarters for the Gulf and Ohio Railways.

== History ==
=== Early history ===
The James Park House sits on what was originally Lot 59 in Charles McClung's 1791 plat of Knoxville. Sevier purchased the lot and began construction of the brick foundation of the house in the 1790s, and completed a portion of the wall facing Cumberland Avenue. Due to financial difficulties, however, he abandoned the house's construction, and moved to his farm at Marble Springs, on the city's periphery. Sevier sold the lot to his son, George Washington Sevier, in 1801, and the younger Sevier in turn sold it to South Carolina merchant James Dunlap in 1807.

In 1812, the lot with its unfinished house was purchased by James Park, a Scots-Irish merchant from County Donegal, Ireland, who had arrived in Knoxville in 1798. According to some historians, the original wing of Park's house was designed by Thomas Hope, an early Knoxville architect who also designed the Ramsey House and Statesview. Likely before 1820, Park added a second wing to the house, giving it its characteristic L-shape.

Park served as mayor of Knoxville from 1818 to 1821, and again from 1824 until 1826. In 1839, he lost Knoxville's first popular mayoral election to W.B.A. Ramsey by one vote. Park and his wife, Sophia Moody, had 12 children, some of whom were born in the Park House. President Andrew Jackson stayed at the Park House on a visit to Knoxville in 1830.

=== Reverend James Park ===
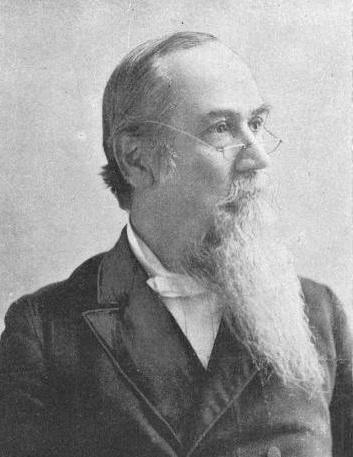
The Rev. James Park (1822–1912)

Park's eleventh child, also named James Park, was born in the Park House in 1822. The younger James Park graduated from East Tennessee College in 1840 and from Princeton Theological Seminary in 1846, after which he was licensed as a Presbyterian preacher. He briefly served as co-principal of the East Tennessee Female Institute before moving to Rogersville in the 1850s to preach at that city's First Presbyterian Church. He returned to Knoxville in 1860 to accept a position as principal of the Tennessee School for the Deaf (then located in what is now Old City Hall).

During the Civil War, Park moved to his country home in Cedar Springs (in what is now West Knoxville). In late 1863, General James Longstreet, whose army was attempting to retake Knoxville from an occupying Union force, dined at Park's Cedar Springs house. Park later recalled that Longstreet had an inaccurate map that showed the confluence of the French Broad and Holston rivers to be below Knoxville, and refused to believe Park when he pointed out that the confluence was actually upriver from Knoxville.

After the war, Park was appointed preacher of Knoxville's First Presbyterian Church, and he moved into the James Park House, where he would live for most of the remainder of his life. An 1871 map of Knoxville shows the house surrounded by a grove of trees and a few outbuildings, with the St. John's Episcopal Church (predecessor of St. John's Cathedral) across Cumberland to the north. An 1886 map, on the other hand, shows the house surrounded by the church and numerous smaller houses, reflecting Knoxville's rapid post-war growth.

=== 20th century ===
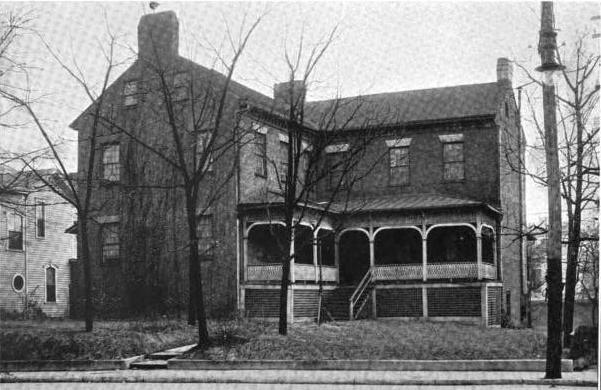
The James Park House, as it appeared circa 1918

After Park's death in 1912, his house was sold and converted into office space. The house was used as a Red Cross workshop during World War I, and served as a medical clinic in the years following the war. In 1945, the Knoxville Academy of Medicine, headed by prominent physician Herbert Acuff (who was also instrumental in constructing the nearby Medical Arts Building), purchased and renovated the house. The Academy used the house for several decades before relocating to West Knoxville.

In 2002, Gulf and Ohio Railroads CEO Pete Claussen and his wife, Linda, purchased the house for use as the Gulf and Ohio's headquarters. Working with architect Lee Ingram of the firm, Brewer Ingram Fuller, the Claussens removed several modern elements and restored the house to its 19th-century appearance. These changes included the removal of a 1968 rear medical auxiliary and auditorium, and the restoration of the house's Victorian-era porch. The renovations were largely completed in 2007.

== Design ==
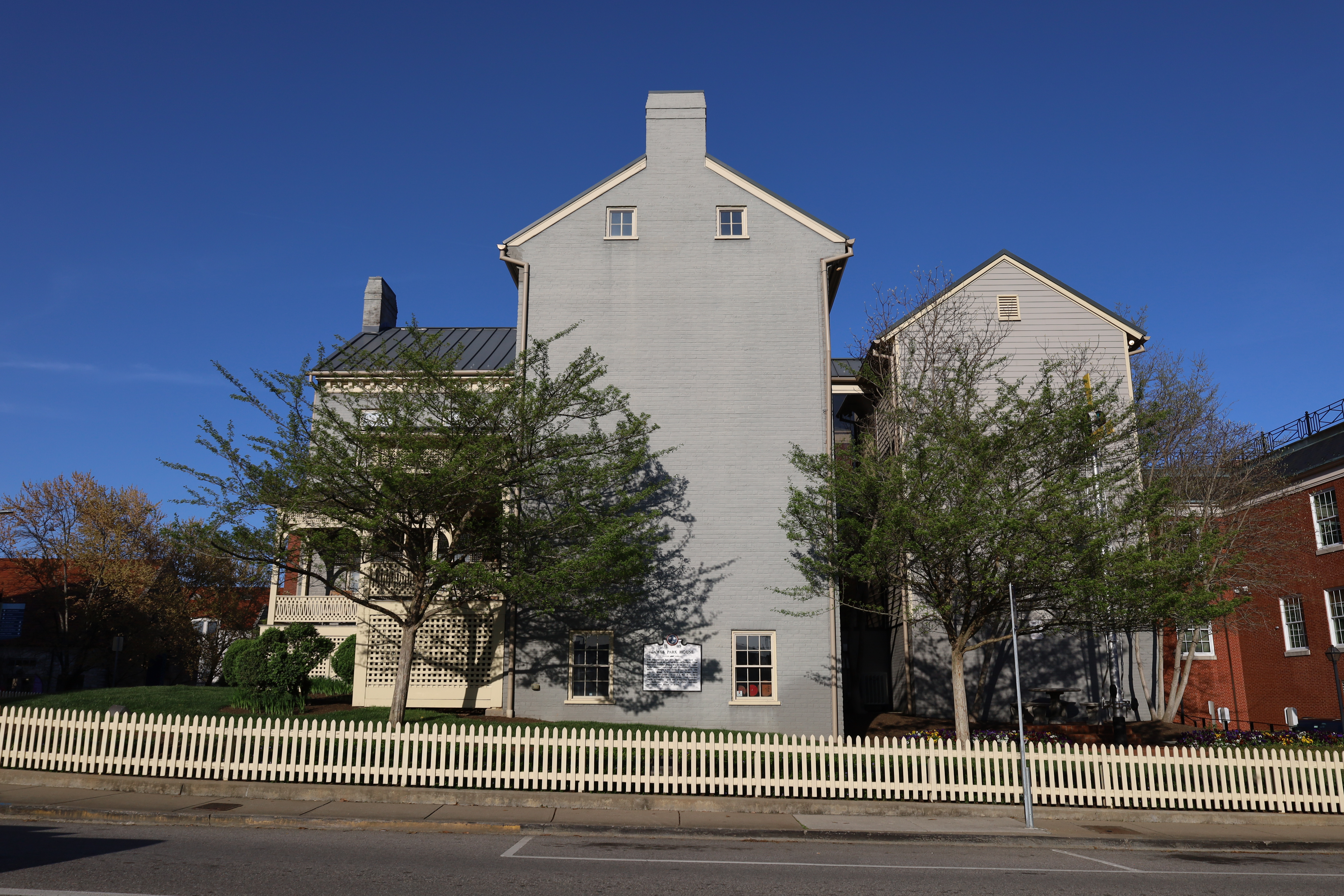
Side view in 2025

The James Park House is a 2 1/2-story, L-shaped house with a modern service wing located at the rear. Claussen's restorations, guided in part by old photographs and architectural research, included the re-addition of a picket fence surrounding the property, reconstruction of the house's Victorian-style front porch, rebuilding of the front stairs, and the reshaping of the chimneys. An arched fireplace in the basement, the design of which is nearly identical to a fireplace in the nearby Craighead-Jackson House, was also restored.

The floors of the modern addition to the house have been painted with various historical maps of Knoxville. One of the house's restrooms contains a ceiling-to-floor safe. Another restroom is modeled after the restroom of the Red Sage restaurant in Washington, D.C. A windowpane in the house contains the name "Sallie," which was probably etched by a daughter of the Reverend James Park.

== Resources ==
- Isenhour, Judith Clayton. Knoxville - A Pictorial History. (Donning, 1978), page 164.
- Knoxville: Fifty Landmarks. (Knoxville: The Knoxville Heritage Committee of the Junior League of Knoxville, 1976), page 12.
- The Future of Knoxville's Past: Historic and Architectural Resources in Knoxville, Tennessee (Knoxville Historic Zoning Commission, October 2006), page 19.
