= Marble Springs =

- U.S. National Register of Historic Places
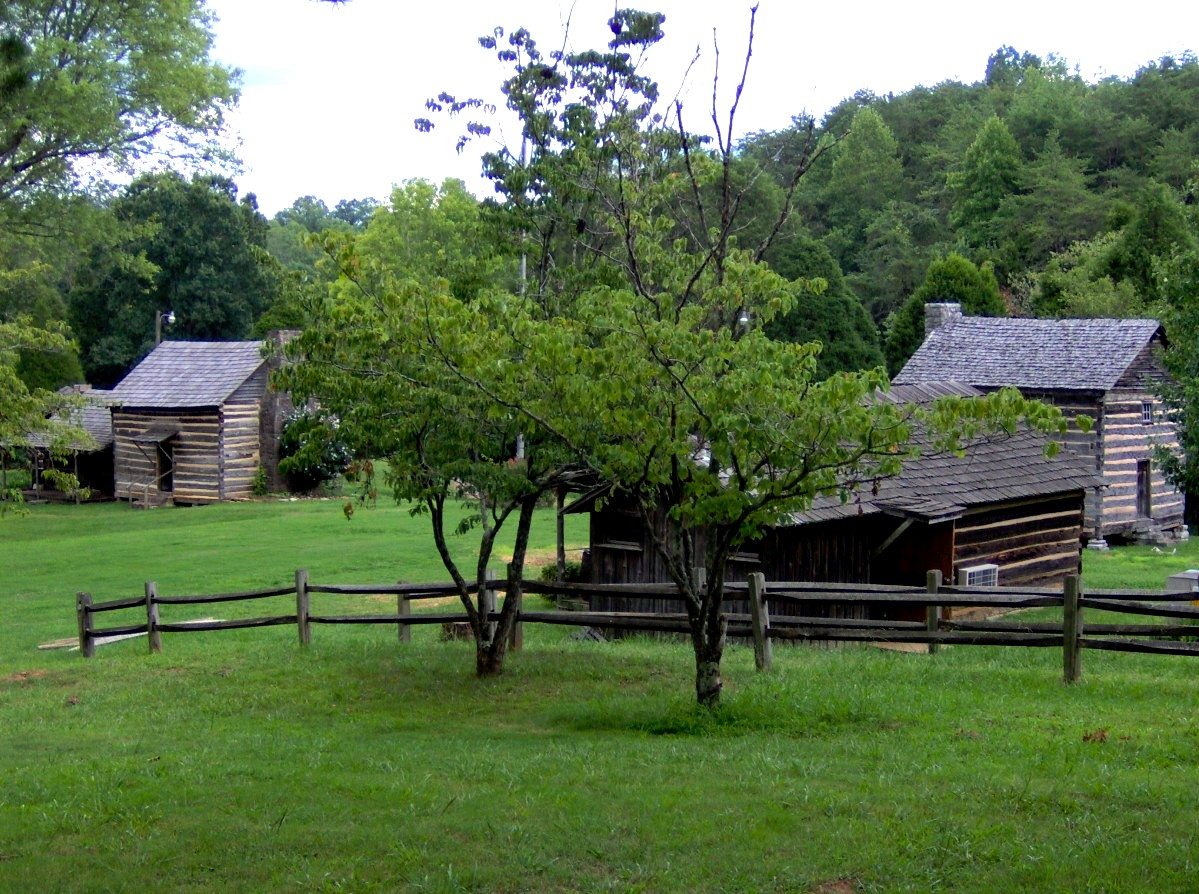
- Location: S of Knoxville on Neubert Springs Rd.
- Nearest city: Knoxville, Tennessee
- Coordinates: 35.89725°N 83.87615°W
- Built: 1790s - early 1800s
- NRHP reference No.: 71000823
- Added to NRHP: May 6, 1971

Marble Springs, also known as the Gov. John Sevier Home, is a state historic site in south Knox County, Tennessee, in the southeastern United States. The site was the home of John Sevier (1745–1815)—a Revolutionary War and frontier militia commander and later the first governor of Tennessee—from 1790 until his death in 1815. A cabin at the site was once believed to have been Sevier's cabin, although recent dendrochronological analyses place the cabin's construction date in the 1830s, well after Sevier had died.

Along with the "Sevier" cabin, several out-buildings have been moved from elsewhere in East Tennessee and several have been reconstructed to simulate a typical pioneer farm from Sevier's time. The 35.4-acre (0.143 km^{2}) site also includes a pavilion and an outdoor stage. The site is managed for the Tennessee Historical Commission by the Governor John Sevier Memorial Association.

== Geographical setting ==
Marble Springs is situated in a valley between a low ridge known as Brown Mountain to the north and the hills that comprise the southwest flank of Bays Mountain to the south. These two mountains are part of the Appalachian Ridge-and-Valley Physiographic Province. The area is drained by Stock Creek, which empties into the Fort Loudoun Lake impoundment of the Tennessee River roughly 10 miles (16 km) to the west.

The Marble Springs site is located just off Tennessee State Route 168 (Governor John Sevier Highway), which connects U.S. Route 129 (Alcoa Highway) to the west with U.S. Route 441 (Chapman Highway) to the east. The site is entirely within Knox County, although the Blount County line is just over 5 miles (8.0 km) to the southwest and the Sevier County line is just over 5 miles (8.0 km) to the southeast.

== History ==
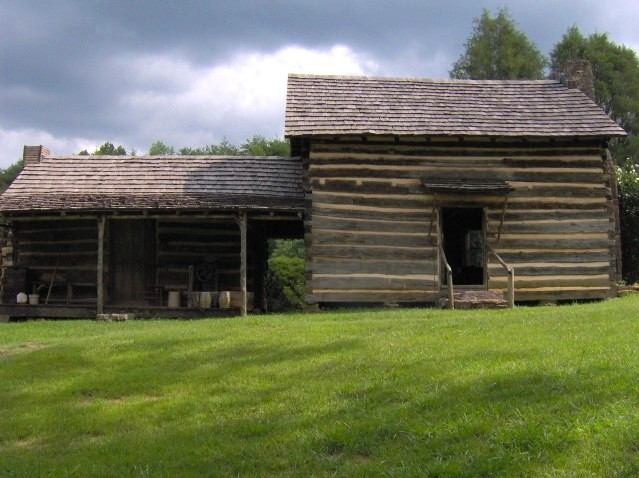
The Sevier cabin

John Sevier arrived in Tennessee from his native Virginia in the early 1770s. He quickly earned a reputation as a competent frontier militia commander, helping the American cause at the Battle of King's Mountain (1780) and defeating the Cherokee at the Battle of Boyd's Creek (also in 1780). Sevier served as the only governor of the short-lived State of Franklin (1785–1788) and later as governor of Tennessee for six terms, 1796–1801 and 1803–1809. Sevier served as a state senator from 1809 to 1811 and as a U.S. congressman from 1811 until his death.

Sevier officially obtained the Marble Springs area in 1796, although he was living there as early as 1790 (the site was within a days' journey of Knoxville, which at the time served as capital of the Southwest Territory). He named it after springs on the property that flowed continuously throughout the year. Structures on the farm included a springhouse, corn crib, smokehouse, and several other cabins.

Sevier's children sold Marble Springs to an attorney named James Dardis in 1818. Dardis leased the property to the family of George Kirby, who was living at Marble Springs in 1840. Kirby purchased the property from the Dardis family when Dardis died in 1847. In 1941, the state of Tennessee appropriated funds to purchase and restore Marble Springs. The Tennessee Historical Commission and the John Sevier Memorial Commission oversaw the site's restoration.

=== Dendrochronological research ===
In April 2007, the University of Tennessee conducted a dendrochronological analysis of logs in both the Sevier cabin and the Walker cabin. Researchers determined that the oldest logs in the Sevier cabin were harvested around 1835, placing its construction date well after the death of Sevier. The cabin's likely builder was George Kirby, who lived as a tenant at Marble Springs during this period.

== Historical structures at Marble Springs ==
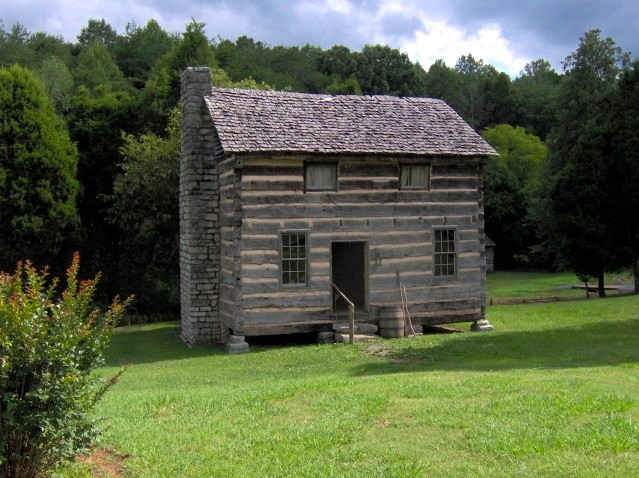
The Walker cabin

Along with Sevier's cabin, several outbuildings have been added to Marble Springs to give visitors an idea of life on an 18th-century Tennessee Valley farm. In Sevier's time, numerous barns, smokehouses, and other buildings would have been scattered across the 375-acre (1.52 km^{2}) tract.

1. The John Sevier Cabin, built around 1835. It is the only structure original to the site. The cabin's dog-trot kitchen—a common sight on pioneer cabins in the region—was a later addition. The cabin currently contains several artifacts donated by the Sevier family.

2. The Walker Cabin, built around 1828. This building was moved intact from a farm just off Walker Springs Road in Knox County. The Walker cabin is used by the site to represent a frontier tavern. The cabin's construction date was confirmed by dendrochronological analyses of its logs in 2007.

3. The McCall Smokehouse, built ca. 1850. This building was donated by the McCall family, whose farm lay a few miles south of Marble Springs.

4. The Loom House, built in 1970. This building was constructed from logs taken from an old log building on the McCall farm, and contains looms and wheels for spinning both wool and flax.

Other buildings include a springhouse, a corn crib, and several work areas.

== See also ==
- James Park House
