= The Hill, Knoxville =

Coordinates: 35.9576°N 83.9258°W

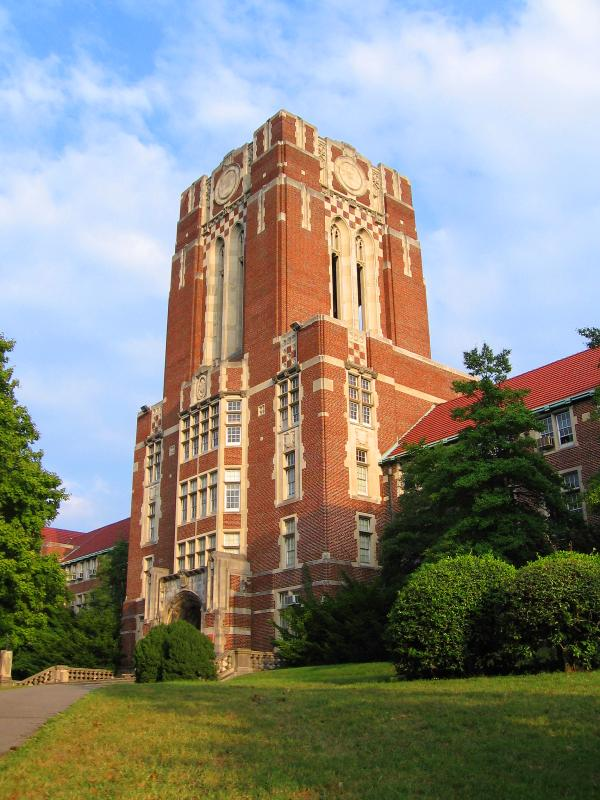
Ayres Hall on the Hill

The Hill is the colloquial name for the location of various academic buildings on the University of Tennessee, Knoxville's campus. It comprises the oldest part of the university, and is located at the eastern side of the campus. There are two concentric roads around the Hill and university buildings ring both routes, with Ayres Hall located at the apex. The sweeping lawn in front of Ayres Hall that drops to Cumberland Avenue is one of the largest open spaces on the campus. Programmatically, the Hill is populated primarily by engineering and science programs. Other university programs, as well as the dormitories and administrative headquarters, are located west of the Hill.

Along with Neyland Stadium, the Rock, and the Torchbearer statue, the Hill is one of the most recognizable symbols of the university.

The Hill was originally known as Barbara Hill, in honor of the daughter of Governor William Blount. Thomas Jefferson had previously recommended that the college relocate from its confining single building on State Street in downtown Knoxville to a site where it could spread out. In the Summer of 1826, the trustees of what was then known as East Tennessee College explored the location west of the city and soon purchased it for $600. While excavating to construct the first buildings on the site, they found two forgotten graves of early settlers who had died before Knoxville had a cemetery. By the Fall of 1828, East Tennessee College had relocated to the new site. During the American Civil War (1861–1864) the Hill was a fortified position southeast of Fort Sanders known as Fort Byington. It played a key role during the Siege of Knoxville.
