= The Rock (University of Tennessee) =

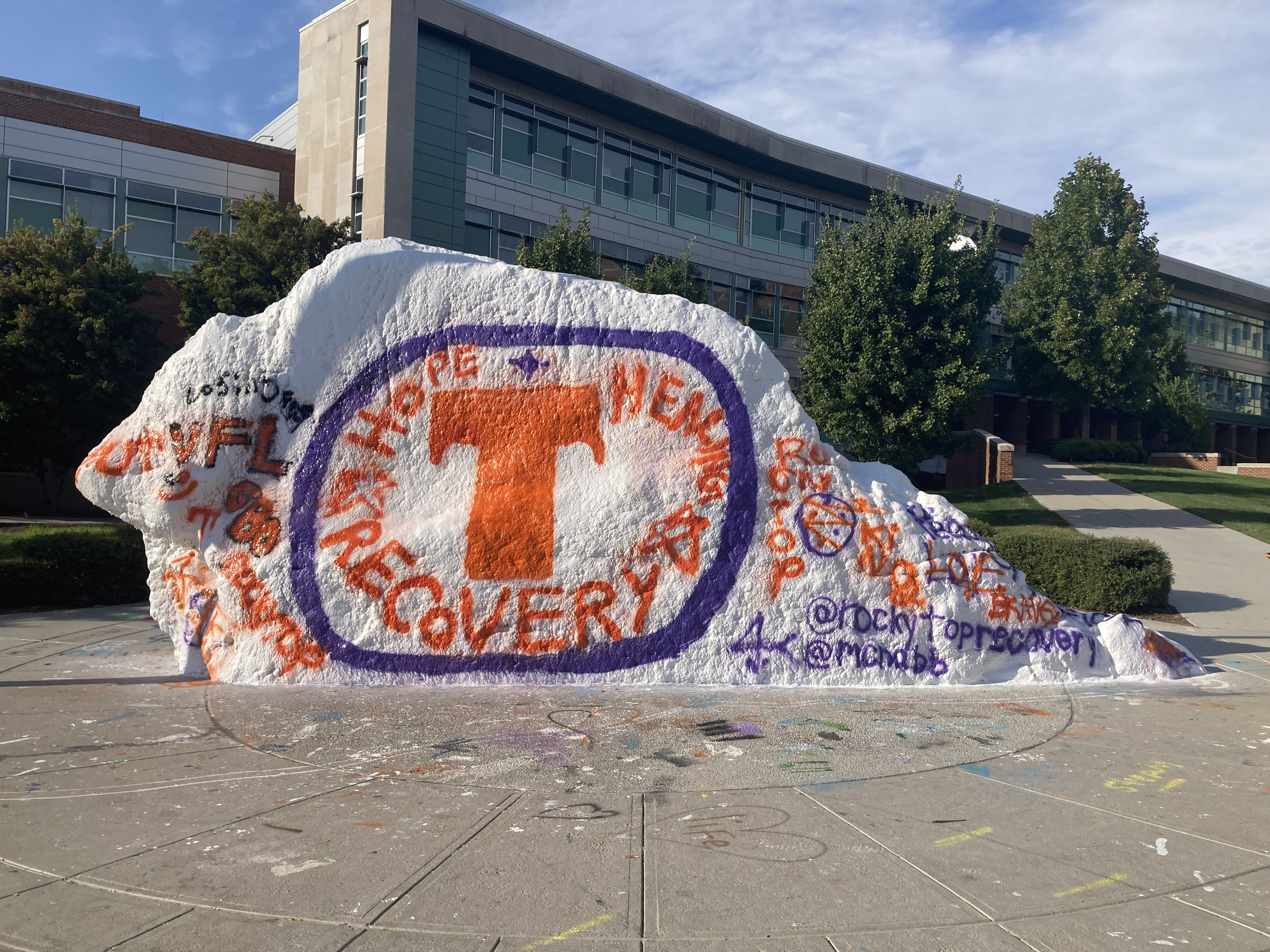
- The Rock on September 16th, 2024
- Location: University of Tennessee
- Coordinates: 35°57′5″N 83°55′51″W
- Type: Megalithic
- Material: Stone
- Weight: 97.5 ton
- Opening date: 1980s

The Rock is a large dolomite boulder on the Knoxville campus of the University of Tennessee. It is a prominent part of student life and campus culture, and is often painted with murals or political messages, including paintings of mascots, coaches, and protest artwork for various causes.

== History ==
The Rock was originally unearthed in 1966 during construction work on the lawn of former Calvary Baptist Church, current location of the Fraternity Park.

The tradition of painting the boulder began in the early 1980s, and after a brief attempt to keep it graffiti free, the university administration decided in 1982 to cease the removal of graffiti unless it was considered offensive. This prompted a discussion surrounding the freedom of speech implications of selectively removing messages. The university decided to depend on the student body to regulate the appearance of the Rock, a policy which has been in place since.

In 2009, it was moved from its original location to the lawn of the Natalie L. Haslam Music Center to make room for an expansion of the Student Health Center, a distance of about 275 feet. The relocation involved a specialized flatbed truck, and took more than 13 hours.

== Controversy ==
In the aftermath of the 2018 Tree of Life synagogue shooting, a memorial painted on the Rock was defaced with a swastika and the words "Stronger through Hate." Since early 2017, there had been several other incidents of hate speech being promoted on the Rock, including the words "white pride" being written on the boulder. It is thought that the far-right Traditionalist Worker Party was responsible, as the abbreviation TWP was included in one of the messages. After both incidents, the student body responded by painting over the messages.

In response, the University of Tennessee installed a 24/7 livestream of the Rock as a "symbol that our community is taking collective responsibility for the Rock".
