= Statesview =

Historic house in Tennessee, United States

- U.S. National Register of Historic Places
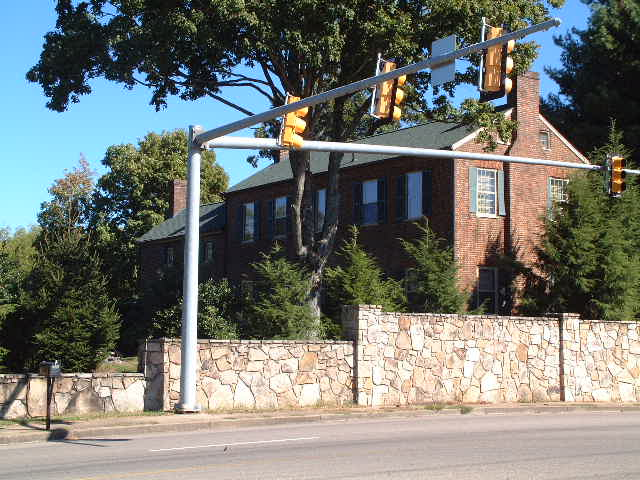
- Statesview's surroundings are much changed since 1806
- Location: About 10 mi. SW of (Downtown) Knoxville off U.S. 70
- Nearest city: Knoxville, Tennessee
- Coordinates: 35°54′13″N 84°4′31″W
- Architectural style: Federal
- NRHP reference No.: 73001805
- Added to NRHP: April 24, 1973

Statesview, or States View, is a historic house located on South Peters Road off Kingston Pike in Knoxville, Tennessee, United States. Built in 1805 by Knoxville architect Thomas Hope and rebuilt in 1823 following a fire, Statesview was originally the home of surveyor Charles McClung. Following McClung's death, newspaper publisher Frederick Heiskell purchased the house and estate, which he renamed "Fruit Hill." The house is listed on the National Register of Historic Places for its architecture and political significance.

== Design ==
Statesview is a simple, two-story Federal-style brick house, located on a wooded lot opposite the intersection of South Peters Road and George Williams Road. The house consists of a main section, a smaller (but still two stories) northeast wing, and a modern rear addition. The main section consists of a central entry hall flanked by rooms on either side, with a staircase leading to the second story. It is unknown how closely the current house, reconstructed following a fire in 1823, resembles the original house, or if it includes any part of the original.

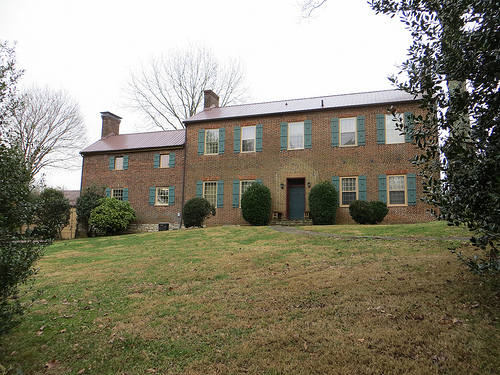
Statesview Original Homestead

== History ==
Statesview was built for early Knoxville surveyor Charles McClung, a son-in-law of Knoxville founder James White. McClung drew up the original 1791 plat of Knoxville and surveyed what is now Kingston Pike during the same period. Construction on Statesview, then located in an isolated area west of Knoxville, began around 1804 and was completed in 1805. To build the house, McClung hired Thomas Hope, an English-born architect and house joiner who had previously built the Ramsey House in east Knox County.

Following McClung's death in 1835, his heirs sold the house and estate to Frederick Heiskell. Heiskell had cofounded the Knoxville Register, the city's leading newspaper, in 1816. Prior to purchasing Statesview, he sold his interest in the paper and retired. Heiskell renamed the estate "Fruit Hill."

By the time Heiskell purchased Statesview, the estate consisted of 1,200 acres (490 ha) and included a gristmill along nearby Sinking Creek (modern Ten Mile Creek) known as "Mansion Mill" (replaced c.1870 by Ebenezer Mill), as well as a sawmill. Heiskell planted extensive orchards throughout the estate, where he grew apples, pears, peaches, cherries, plums, and quinces. He also raised horses, cattle, and hogs.

Around 1880, Heiskell, then in his early 90s, moved back to Knoxville. The ownership of Statesview passed to his stepson, James Fulkerson.

== See also ==
- Alexander Bishop House
- Knollwood (Bearden Hill)
- James Park House
- Colonel John Williams House
