= Charles McClung =

American pioneer and politician (1761–1835)

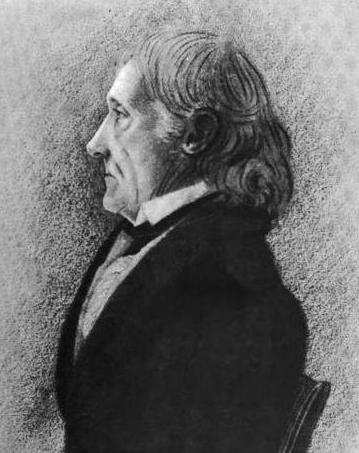
- Portrait from Rule's Standard History of Knoxville
- Born: May 13, 1761; Lancaster County, Pennsylvania, British America
- Died: August 9, 1835 (aged 74); Harrodsburg, Kentucky, US
- Resting place: Old Gray Cemetery, Knoxville, Tennessee, US
- Occupation: Surveyor
- Spouse: Margaret White
- Children: Mary Lawson McClung (Williams); Hugh McClung; Matthew McClung; James White McClung; Charles McClung; Elizabeth Jones McClung (McGhee); Martha McClung; Hugh Lawson McClung; Margaret Ann McClung (Alexander)
- Parent(s): Matthew McClung and Martha Cunningham

Charles McClung (May 13, 1761 – August 9, 1835) was an American pioneer, politician, and surveyor best known for drawing up the original plat of Knoxville, Tennessee, in 1791. While Knoxville has since expanded to many times its original size, the city's downtown area still roughly follows McClung's 1791 grid. McClung also helped draft Tennessee's constitution in 1796, surveyed and planned what is now Kingston Pike in 1792, and served as Knox County's first court clerk. His home, Statesview, still stands in West Knoxville and has been listed on the National Register of Historic Places.

== Biography ==
=== Early life ===
McClung was born in Lancaster County, Pennsylvania, to Matthew McClung and Martha Cunningham McClung, both of Scots-Irish descent. McClung later claimed that due to his mechanical aptitude, his father gave him an unfair amount of work on the family farm. In 1778, McClung ran away to Philadelphia where he found work as a clerk. His employer was impressed with McClung's penmanship and record-keeping ability, and McClung gradually accumulated over $1,000 in savings. He was fired, however, after he was caught flirting with his employer's daughter.

McClung subsequently returned home and used his earnings to help his parents make improvements to the family farm. In 1788 he departed again, heading southwestward through the Great Valley until he reached White's Fort (modern Knoxville) that same year. In 1790, he married Margaret White (1771–1827), daughter of James White, the fort's builder.

=== Surveyor and politician ===
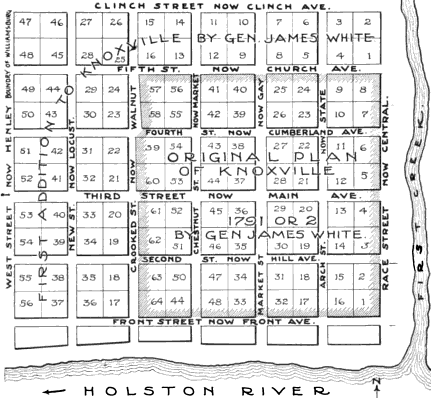
Map showing the original boundaries of Knoxville (shaded)

After the creation of the Southwest Territory in 1790, the territory's governor, William Blount, selected White's Fort as the territory's capital. James White set aside land adjacent to the fort for a new town, named "Knoxville" after Secretary of War Henry Knox. White employed McClung, who had acquired rudimentary knowledge of surveying while in Philadelphia, to draw up lots for the new town, which were sold at auction on October 3, 1791.

McClung's design consisted of a rectangular grid with the Tennessee River (then called the "Holston") as its southern boundary and First Creek as its eastern boundary. The grid's original northern boundary was the road now known as Church Avenue, and its original western boundary was the road now known as Walnut Street. This grid was divided into 64 .5-acre (2,000 m^{2}) lots. Most of the early street names for the city (e.g., Front Street) were derived from street names in Philadelphia, where McClung had lived for several years.

In 1792, McClung surveyed and planned what is now Kingston Pike from Knoxville to Campbell's Station (Farragut). The road was built to connect Knoxville with Fort Southwest Point, which was the eastern terminus of the Avery Trace. The road was originally 30 feet wide and was many years later widened to 50 feet. During the same period, McClung was appointed Knox County's first court clerk, a position he held until 1834. He was present at the Tennessee constitutional convention in 1796 and helped draft the state's initial constitution. That same year, he was elected major in the state's Hamilton District militia.

=== Later life and legacy ===
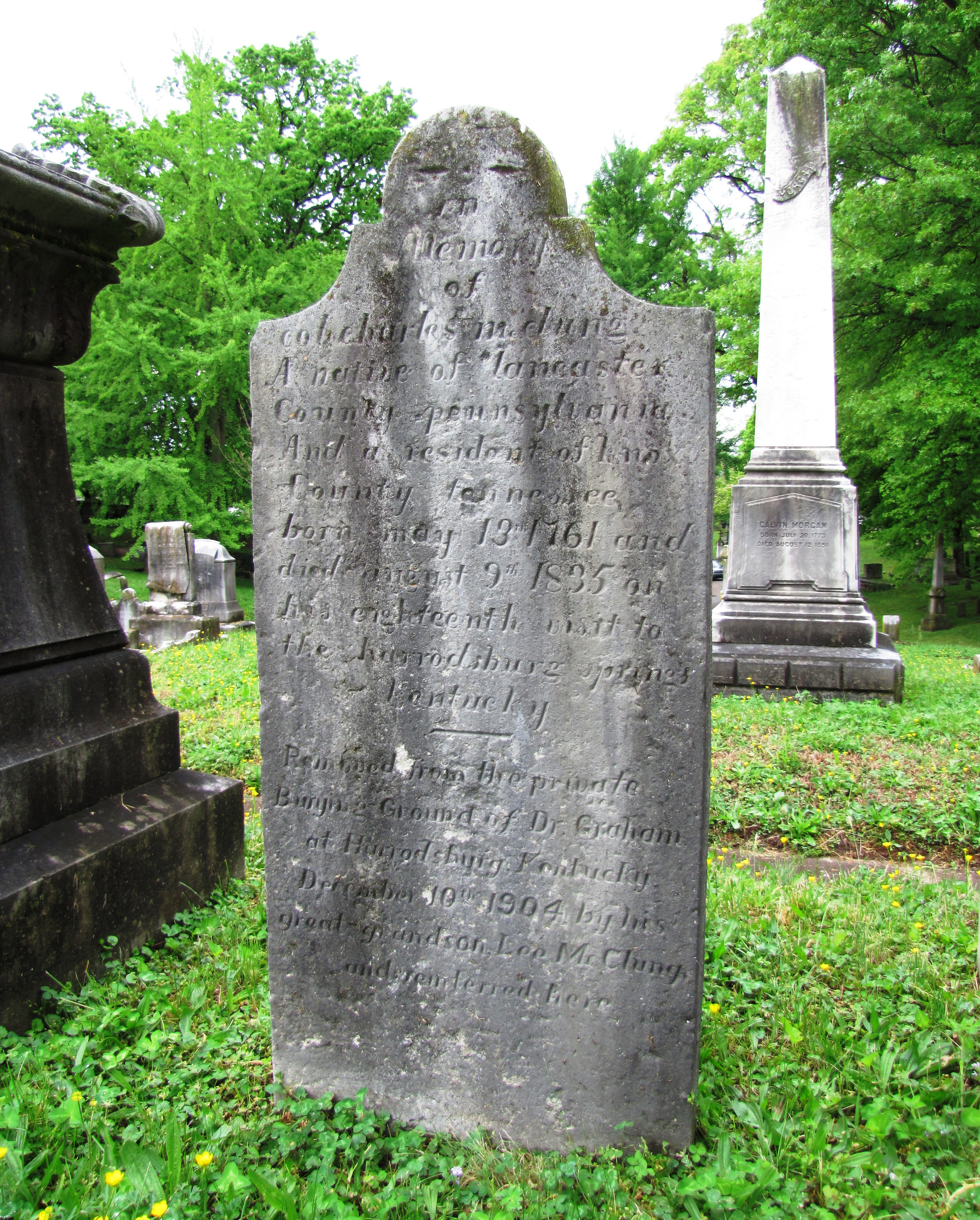
McClung's grave at Old Gray Cemetery

In 1805, McClung hired prominent early Knoxville architect Thomas Hope to build his country home, Statesview, about 10 miles (16 km) west of Knoxville, just off the Kingston road. McClung lived in the house until his death in 1835. In 1816, McClung and his eldest surviving son, Matthew, formed Charles McClung and Son, which operated a general store in Knoxville. In 1828, both Charles and Matthew McClung helped establish the Knoxville Female Academy and donated land and money for the construction of the academy's school building.

McClung died while vacationing at Harrodsburg Springs, Kentucky, in 1835, and was initially buried in a private cemetery in Harrodsburg. In 1904, McClung's great-grandson, Lee McClung, had his remains reinterred in the family's plot in Knoxville's Old Gray Cemetery.

For over a century after his death, McClung's descendants continued to play prominent roles in the cultural and economic affairs of Knoxville. Along with Lee McClung, who served as Treasurer of the United States in the early 1900s, McClung's descendants include railroad magnate Charles McClung McGhee and businessman Calvin Morgan McClung. The Lawson McGhee Library, the Frank H. McClung Museum, and the Calvin M. McClung Historical Collection are among the institutions established by McClung's descendants. McClung's Statesview home still stands in West Knoxville. Another house once owned by McClung, the Alexander Bishop House, still stands in Powell, just north of Knoxville.
