= Alexander Bishop House =

Historic house in Tennessee, United States

- U.S. National Register of Historic Places
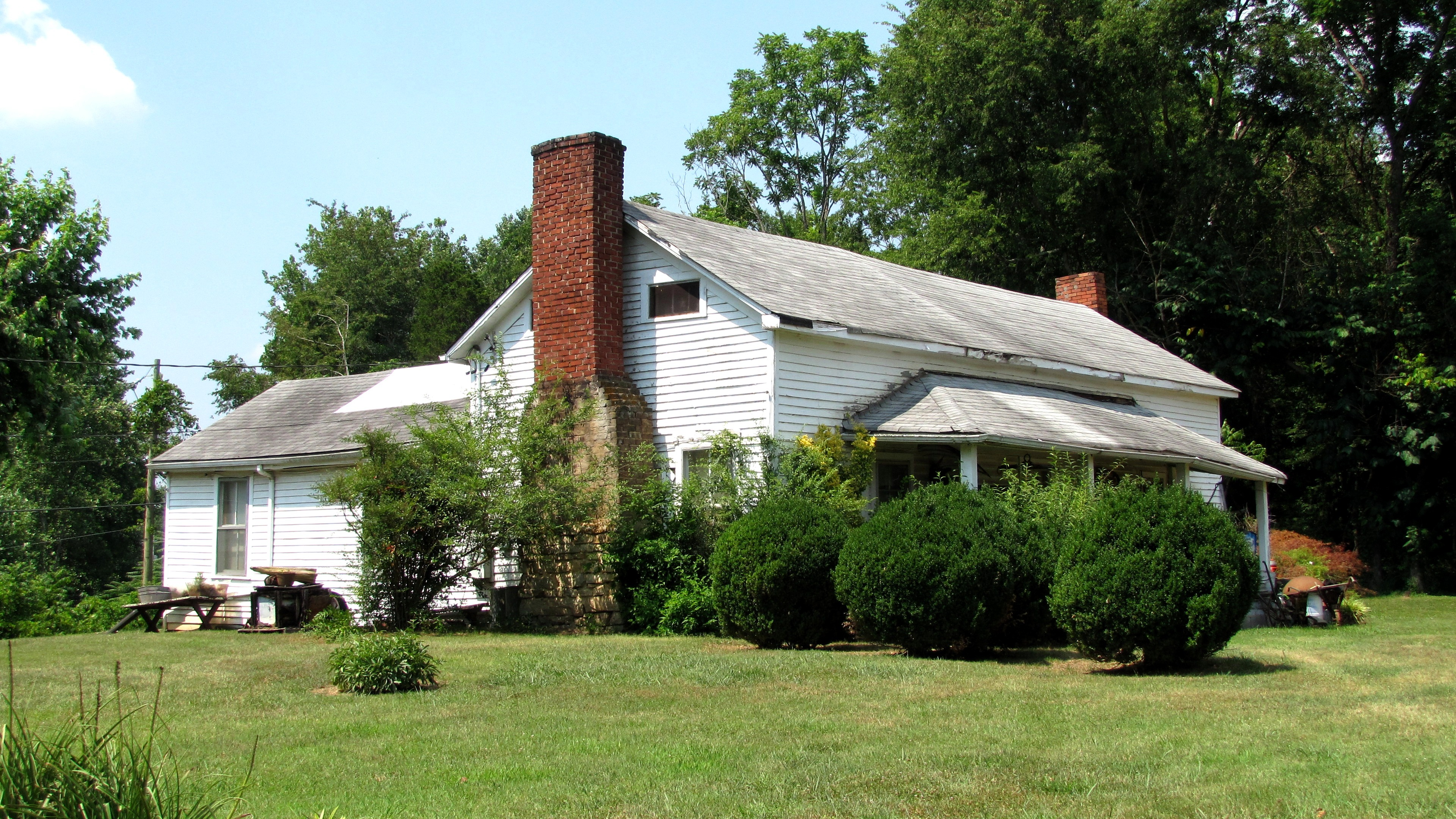

- Location within Tennessee Location within the United States
- Interactive map showing the location of Alexander Bishop House
- Location: 7924 Bishop Rd. Knoxville, Tennessee
- Coordinates: 36°3′51″N 83°59′35″W
- Built: 1793
- MPS: Knoxville and Knox County MPS
- NRHP reference No.: 97000953
- Added to NRHP: September 3, 1997

The Alexander Bishop House, sometimes called the Donelson-Bishop House, is a historic home located in the Powell community of Knox County, Tennessee, United States. Built in 1793 by pioneer Stockley Donelson (1753–1804), the house is one of the oldest in Knox County. Alexander Bishop, the house's namesake, purchased it in 1856, and his descendants have maintained it ever since. In 1997, the house was added to the National Register of Historic Places as an example of late eighteenth-century architecture and for its role in the region's settlement.

The house is a notable surviving example of a late eighteenth century double-pen long house. The oldest part of the house still contains several features common to early frontier houses, such as full dovetail joints, fireplaces with stone foundations, boxed stairs, and broad floorboards. The house was originally oriented toward old Jacksboro Pike, which passed through the area roughly along what is now Pedigo Road. Sometime after 1825, the house was combined with an adjacent log house. The clapboard siding was added by Bishop during the latter half of the nineteenth century.

Stockley Donelson, the house's builder, was the son of Middle Tennessee pioneer John Donelson, and brother of Rachel Jackson, wife of Andrew Jackson. In 1796, Donelson sold the house to early Knoxville surveyor Charles McClung. McClung sold the house to Mrs. Charles Curd in 1825, and her family in turn sold the house to Bishop in 1856. Bishop moved to Texas in 1879, and the house was given to his son.
