= History of Knoxville, Tennessee =

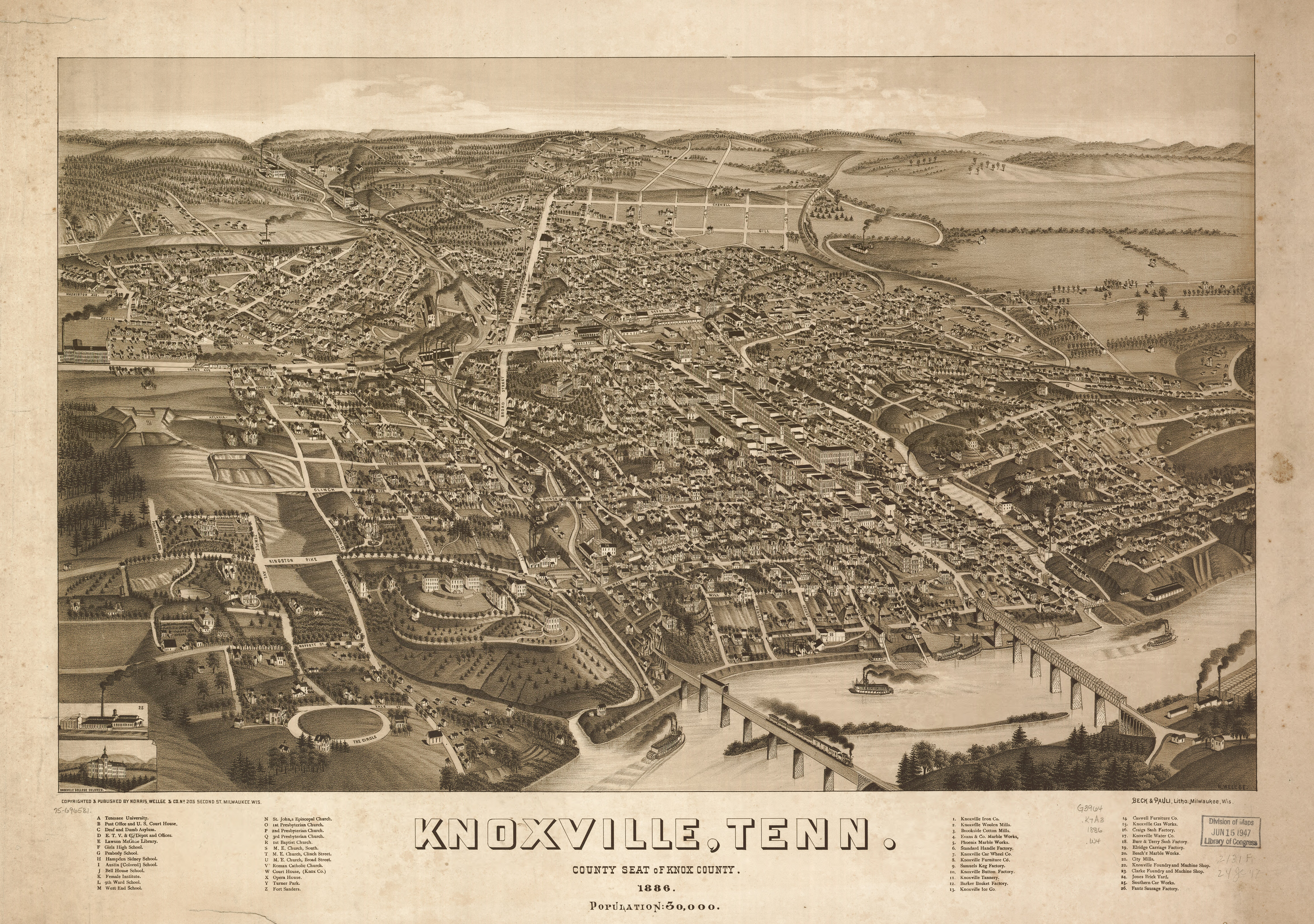

The History of Knoxville, Tennessee, began with the establishment of James White's Fort on the Trans-Appalachian frontier in 1786. The fort was chosen as the capital of the Southwest Territory in 1790, and the city, named for Secretary of War Henry Knox, was platted the following year. Knoxville became the first capital of the State of Tennessee in 1796, and grew steadily during the early 19th century as a way station for westward-bound migrants and as a commercial center for nearby mountain communities. The arrival of the railroad in the 1850s led to a boom in the city's population and commercial activity.

While a Southern city, Knoxville was home to a strong pro-Union element during the secession crisis of the early 1860s, and remained bitterly divided throughout the Civil War. The city was occupied by Confederate forces until September 1863, when Union forces entered the city unopposed. Confederate forces laid siege to the city later that year, but retreated after failing to breach the city's fortifications during the Battle of Fort Sanders.

Following the war, business leaders, many from the North, established major iron and textile industries in Knoxville. As a nexus between rural towns in Southern Appalachia and the nation's great manufacturing centers, Knoxville grew to become the third-largest wholesaling center in the South. Tennessee marble, extracted from quarries on the city's periphery, was used in the construction of numerous monumental buildings across the country, earning Knoxville the nickname, "The Marble City."

Knoxville's economy slowed in the early 1900s. Political factioning hampered revitalization efforts throughout much of the 20th century, though the creation of federal entities such as the Tennessee Valley Authority in the 1930s and the ten-fold expansion of the University of Tennessee helped keep the economy stable. Beginning in the late 1960s, a city council more open to change, along with economic diversification, urban renewal, and the hosting of the 1982 World's Fair, helped the city revitalize to some extent.

== Prehistory and early recorded history ==
=== Native Americans ===
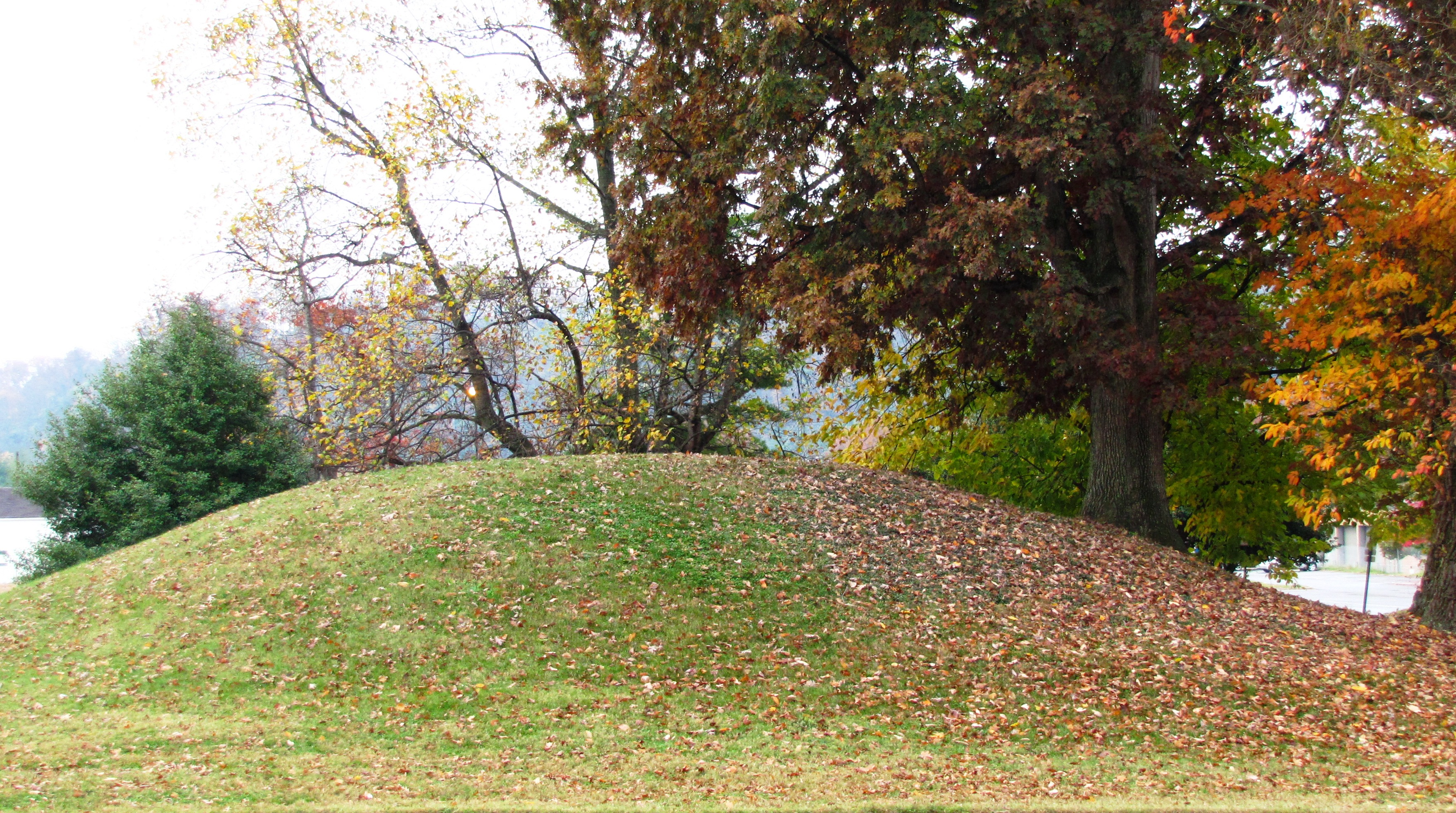
Late-Woodland period burial mound on the University of Tennessee campus

The first humans to form substantial settlements in what is now Knoxville arrived during the Woodland period (c. 1000 B.C. – 1000 A.D). Knoxville's two most prominent prehistoric structures are Late Woodland period burial mounds, one located along Cherokee Boulevard in Sequoyah Hills, and the other located along Joe Johnson Drive on the University of Tennessee campus. Substantial Mississippian period (c. 1100–1600 A.D.) village sites have been found at Post Oak Island (along the river near the Knox-Blount line), and at Bussell Island (near Lenoir City).

The Spanish expedition of Hernando de Soto is believed to have traveled down the French Broad Valley and visited the Bussell Island village in 1540 en route to the Mississippi River. A follow-up expedition led by Juan Pardo may have visited village sites in the Little Tennessee Valley in 1567. The records of these two expeditions suggest the area was part of a Muskogean chiefdom known as Chiaha, which was subject to the Coosa chiefdom further to the south.

By the 18th century, the Cherokee had become the dominant tribe in the East Tennessee region, although they were consistently at war with the Creeks and Shawnee. The Cherokee people called the Knoxville area kuwanda'talun'yi, which means "Mulberry Place." Most Cherokee habitation in the area was concentrated in the Overhill settlements along the Little Tennessee River, southwest of Knoxville.

=== Early Exploration and late-18th Century Politics ===
By the early 1700s, traders from South Carolina were visiting the Overhill towns regularly, and following the discovery of Cumberland Gap in 1748, long hunters from Virginia began pouring into the Tennessee Valley. At the outbreak of the French and Indian War in 1754, the Cherokee supported the British, who in return constructed Fort Loudoun in 1756 to protect the Overhill towns from the French and their allies. During the Anglo-Cherokee War, however, the Cherokee attacked the fort and killed its occupants in 1760. A peace expedition to the Overhill towns led by Henry Timberlake passed along the river through what is now Knoxville in December 1761.

The Cherokee supported the British during the Revolutionary War, and after the end of the war, North Carolina, which considered the Tennessee Valley part of its territory, deemed Cherokee claims to the region void. North Carolina made plans to cede its Trans-Appalachian territory to the federal government, but decided to open up the lands to settlement first. In 1783, land speculator William Blount and his brother, John Gray Blount, convinced North Carolina to pass a law offering lands in the Tennessee Valley for sale. Later that year, an expedition consisting of James White (1747–1820), James Connor, Robert Love, and Francis Alexander Ramsey, explored the Upper Tennessee Valley, and discovered the future site of Knoxville. Taking advantage of Blount's land-grab act, White took out a claim for the site shortly afterward.

== Early Knoxville ==
=== White's Fort ===
In 1786, White moved to the future site of Knoxville, where he and fellow explorer James Connor built what became known as White's Fort. The site straddled a hill that was bounded by the river on the south, creeks (First Creek and Second Creek) on the east and west, and a swampy declivity on the north. The fort, which originally stood along modern State Street, consisted of four heavily timbered cabins connected by an 8-foot (2.4 m) palisade, enclosing one-quarter acre of ground. White also erected a mill for grinding grain on nearby First Creek.

White's Fort represented the western extreme of the so-called State of Franklin, which Tennessee settlers organized in 1784 after North Carolina reneged on its plans to cede its western territory to the federal government. James White supported the State of Franklin, and served as its Speaker of the Senate in 1786. The federal government never recognized the State of Franklin, however, and by 1789, its supporters once again pledged allegiance to North Carolina.

In 1789, White, William Blount, and former State of Franklin leader John Sevier, now members of the North Carolina state legislature, helped convince the state to ratify the United States Constitution. Following ratification, North Carolina ceded control of its Tennessee territory to the federal government. In May 1790, the United States created the Southwest Territory, which included Tennessee, and President George Washington appointed Blount the territory's governor.

=== Establishment of Knoxville ===
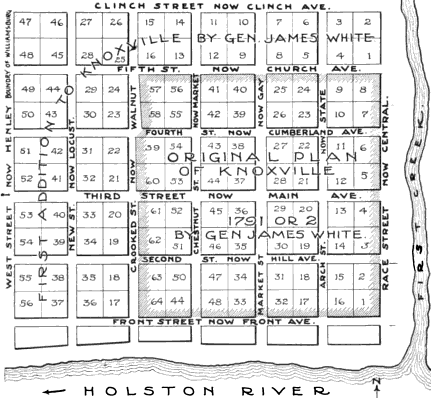
Map showing Charles McClung's 1791 plat and 1795 extension of Knoxville

Blount immediately moved to White's Fort (chosen for its central location) to begin resolving land disputes between the Cherokee and white settlers in the region. In the Summer of 1791, he met with forty-one Cherokee chiefs at the mouth of First Creek to negotiate the Treaty of Holston, which was signed on July 2 of that year. The treaty moved the boundary of Cherokee lands westward to the Clinch River and southwestward to the Little Tennessee River.

While Blount initially sought to place the territorial capital at the confluence of the Clinch and Tennessee rivers (near modern Kingston), where he had land claims, he was unable to convince the Cherokee to completely relinquish this area, and thus settled on White's Fort as the capital. James White set aside land for a new town, which initially consisted of the area now bounded by Church Avenue, Walnut Street, First Creek, and the river, in what is now Downtown Knoxville. White's son-in-law, Charles McClung, surveyed the land and divided it into 64 half-acre lots. Lots were set aside for a church and cemetery, a courthouse, a jail, and a college.

On October 3, 1791, a lottery was held for those wishing to purchase lots in the new city, which was named "Knoxville" in honor of Blount's superior, Secretary of War Henry Knox. Along with Blount and McClung, those who purchased lots in the city included merchants Hugh Dunlap, Thomas Humes, and Nathaniel and Samuel Cowan, newspaper publisher George Roulstone, the Reverend Samuel Carrick, frontiersman John Adair (who had built a fort just to the north in what is now Fountain City), and tavern keeper John Chisholm.

=== Knoxville in the 1790s ===
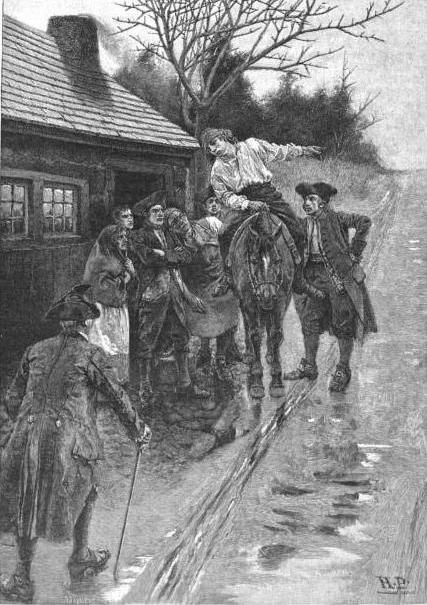
Howard Pyle's depiction of a scout warning Knoxvillians of the approach of a hostile Cherokee (Chickamauga) force in 1793

Following the sale of lots, Knoxville's leaders set about constructing a courthouse and jail. A garrison of federal soldiers, under the command of David Henley, erected a blockhouse in Knoxville in 1792. The Cowan brothers, Nathaniel and Samuel, opened the city's first general store in August 1792, and John Chisholm's tavern was in operation by December 1792. The city's first newspaper, the Knoxville Gazette, was established by George Roulstone in November 1791. In 1794, Blount College, the forerunner of the University of Tennessee, was chartered, with Samuel Carrick as its first president. Carrick also established the city's first church, the First Presbyterian Church, though a building wasn't constructed until 1816.

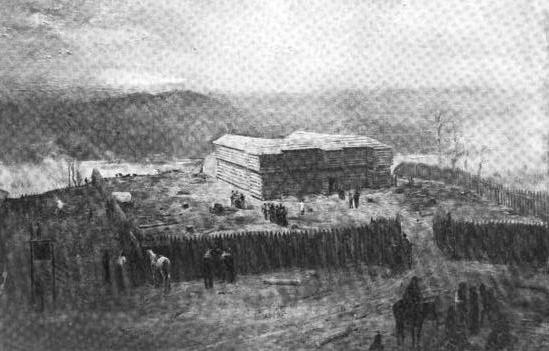
Lloyd Branson's The Blockhouse at Knoxville, Tennessee, showing the federal blockhouse built in 1792

In many ways, early Knoxville was a typical rowdy late-18th century frontier village. A detached group of Cherokee, known as the Chickamaugas, refused to recognize the Holston treaty, and remained a constant threat. In September 1793, a large force of Chickamaugas and Creeks marched on Knoxville, and massacred the inhabitants of Cavet's Station (near modern Bearden) before dispersing. Outlaws roamed the city's periphery, among them the Harpe Brothers, who murdered at least one settler in 1797 before fleeing to Kentucky. Abishai Thomas, an associate of Blount who visited Knoxville in 1794, noted that the city was full of taverns and tippling houses, no churches, and that the blockhouse's jail was overcrowded with criminals.

In 1795, James White set aside more land for the growing city, allowing it to expand northward to modern Clinch Avenue and westward to modern Henley Street. A census that year showed that Tennessee had a large enough population to apply for statehood. In January 1796, delegates from across Tennessee, including Blount, Sevier, and Andrew Jackson, convened in Knoxville to draw up a constitution for the new state, which was admitted to the Union on June 1, 1796. Knoxville was chosen as the initial capital of the state.

== Antebellum Knoxville ==
=== Frontier Capital ===
While Knoxville's population grew steadily in the early 1800s, most new arrivals were westward-bound migrants staying in the town for a brief period. By 1807, some 200 migrants were passing through the town every day. Cattle drovers, who specialized in driving herds of cattle across the mountains to markets in South Carolina, were also frequent visitors to the city. The city's merchants acquired goods from Baltimore and Philadelphia via wagon trains.

French botanist André Michaux visited Knoxville in 1802, and reported the presence of approximately 100 houses and 10 "well-stocked" stores. While there was "brisk commerce" at the city's stores, Michaux noted, the only industries in the city were tanneries and blacksmiths. In February 1804, itinerant Methodist preacher Lorenzo Dow passed through Knoxville, and reported the widespread presence of a religious phenomenon in which worshippers would fall to the ground and go into seizure-like convulsions, or "jerks," at religious rallies. Illinois governor John Reynolds, who studied law in Knoxville, recalled a raucous, anti-British celebration held in the city on July 4, 1812, at the onset of the War of 1812.

On October 27, 1815, Knoxville officially incorporated as a city. The city's new charter set up an alderman-mayor form of government, in which a Board of Aldermen was popularly elected, and in turn selected a mayor from one of their own. This remained Knoxville's style of government until the early 20th century, though the city's charter was amended in 1838 to allow for popular election of mayor as well. In January 1816, Knoxville's newly elected Board of Aldermen chose Judge Thomas Emmerson (1773–1837) as the city's first mayor. With the exceptions of the years 1802, 1807, 1811 and 1812, Knoxville remained the capital of Tennessee until 1817 when the state legislature was moved to Murfreesboro.

=== Sectionalism and Struggles with Isolation ===
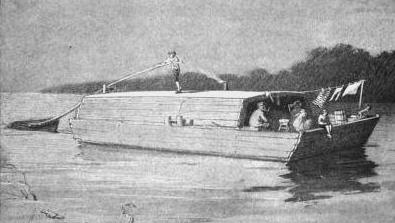
Early-19th century flatboat on the Tennessee River

Historian William MacArthur once described Knoxville as a "product and prisoner of its environment." Throughout the first half of the 19th century, Knoxville's economic growth was stunted by its isolation. The rugged terrain of the Appalachian Mountains made travel in and out of the city by road difficult, with wagon trips to Philadelphia or Baltimore requiring a round trip of several months. Flatboats were in use as early as 1795 to carry goods from Knoxville to New Orleans via the Tennessee, Ohio, and Mississippi rivers, but river hazards near Muscle Shoals and Chattanooga made such a trek risky.

During the 1790s, several roads, many of which followed old Indian trails, were constructed that connected Knoxville to other settlements across East Tennessee. The first of these roads to be constructed was Kingston Pike which was laid out by Charles McClung in 1792. Beginning around 1810, stagecoach service was introduced to Knoxville and continued to operate prior to the Civil War. Known as the "Great Western Line," the route ran westward from Raleigh, North Carolina, over the mountains to Knoxville, and then continued west to Nashville. Although the introduction of stagecoach service somewhat helped to break Knoxville's boundaries of isolation, the trips were often long and rough.

During the 1820s and 1830s, state legislators from East Tennessee continuously bickered with legislators from Middle and West Tennessee over funding for road and navigational improvements. East Tennesseans felt the state had squandered the proceeds from the sale of land in the Hiwassee District (1819) on a failed state bank, rather than on badly needed internal improvements. It wasn't until 1828 that a steamboat, the Atlas, managed to navigate Muscle Shoals and make it upriver to Knoxville. River improvements in the 1830s allowed Knoxville semi-annual access to the Mississippi, though by this time the city's merchants had shifted their focus to railroad construction.

=== Life in Knoxville, 1816–1854 ===
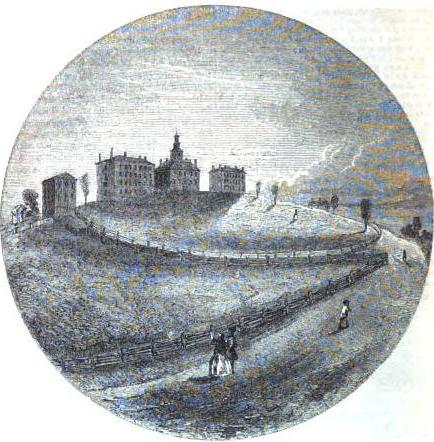
East Tennessee College, the forerunner of the University of Tennessee, moved to "The Hill" west of downtown Knoxville in 1826

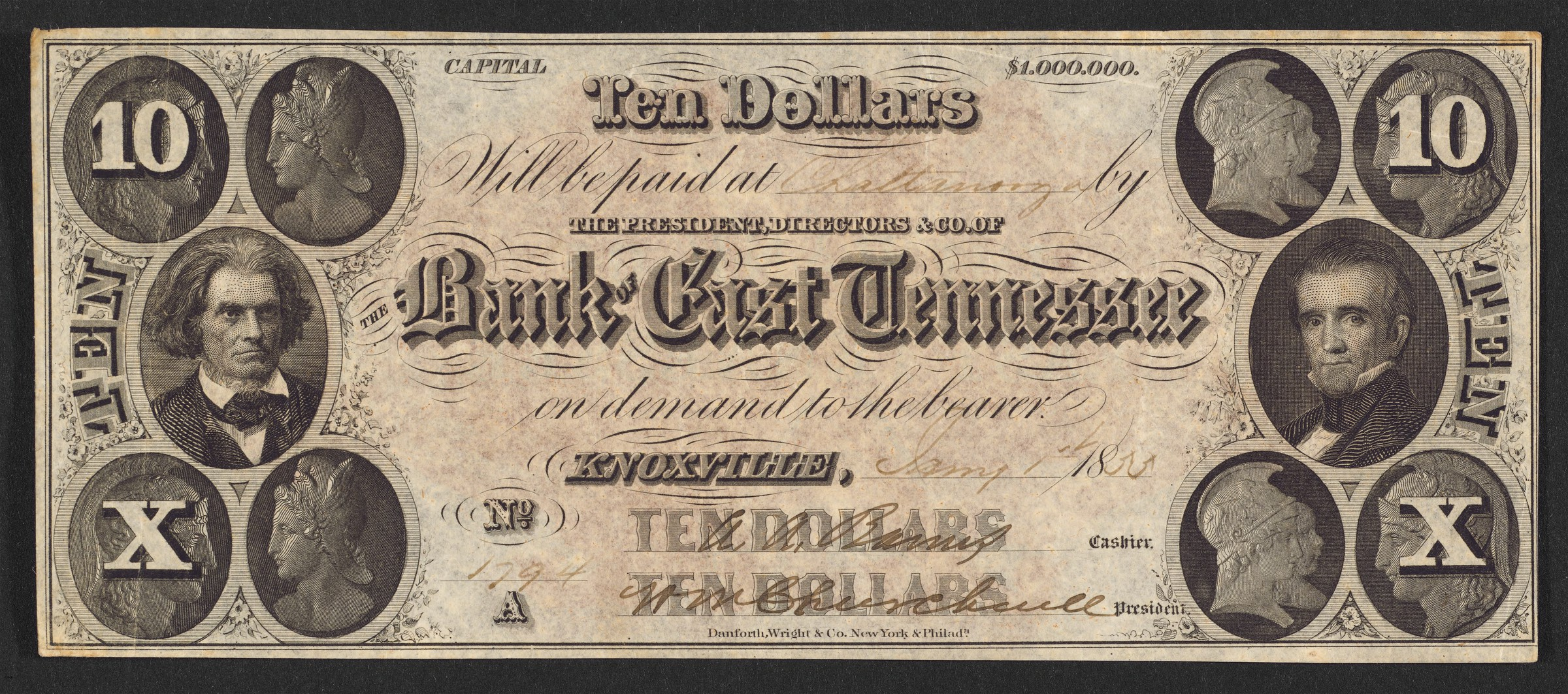
10 dollar 1855 banknote printed by the Bank of East Tennessee in Knoxville

In 1816, as the Gazette was in decline, businessmen Frederick Heiskell and Hugh Brown established a newspaper, the Knoxville Register. Along with the Register, Heiskell and Brown published a pro-emancipation newsletter, the Western Monitor and Religious Observer, as well as books such as John Haywood's Civil and Political History of the State of Tennessee (1823), one of the state's first comprehensive histories. The Register celebrated the move of East Tennessee College (the new name of Blount College following its rechartering in 1807) to Barbara Hill in 1826, and encouraged the trustees of the Knoxville Female Academy, which had been chartered in 1811, to finally hire a faculty and hold its first classes in 1827.

In the April 1839 issue of the Southern Literary Messenger, a traveler who had recently visited Knoxville described the people of the city as "moral, sociable and hospitable," but "with less refinement of mind and manners" than people in older towns. In 1842, English travel writer James Gray Smith reported that the city was home to a university, an academy, a "ladies' school," three churches, two banks, two hotels, 25-30 stores, and several "handsome country residences" occupied by people "as aristocratic as even an Englishman... could possibly desire."

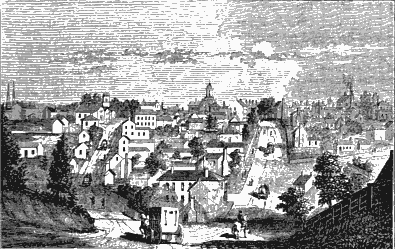
Knoxville in the late-1850s, viewed from the west along Cumberland Avenue

In 1816, merchant Thomas Humes began building a lavish hotel on Gay Street, later known as the Lamar House Hotel, which for decades would provide a gathering place for the city's elite. In 1848, the Tennessee School for the Deaf opened in Knoxville, giving an important boost to the city's economy. In 1854, land speculators Joseph Mabry and William Swan donated land for the creation of Market Square, creating a venue for farmers from the surrounding region to sell their produce.

=== Arrival of the Railroads ===
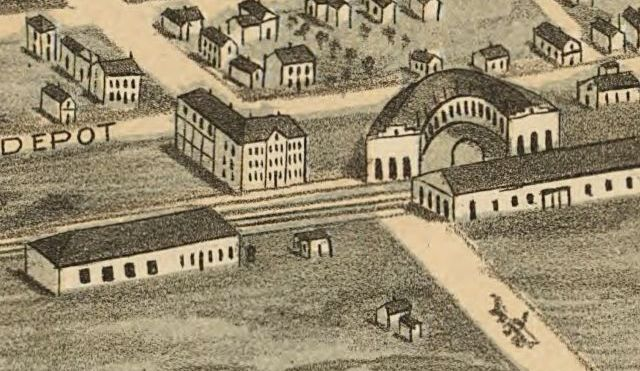
The East Tennessee, Virginia and Georgia rail yard at the intersection of Gay Street (lower right) and Depot Street, as it appeared in 1871; the roundhouse has since been demolished and replaced by the Southern Terminal

As early as the 1820s, Knoxville's business leaders viewed railroads— then a relatively new form of transportation— as a solution to the city's economic isolation. Led by banker J. G. M. Ramsey (1797–1884), Knoxville business leaders joined calls to build a rail line connecting the city to Cincinnati, Ohio to the north and Charleston, South Carolina to the southeast, which led to the chartering of the Louisville, Cincinnati and Charleston Railroad (LC&C) in 1836. The Hiwassee Railroad, chartered two years later, was to connect this line with a rail line in Dalton, Georgia.

In spite of Knoxvillians' enthusiasm (the city celebrated the passage of a state appropriations bill for the LC&C with a 56-gun salute in 1837), the LC&C was doomed by a financial recession in the late 1830s, and construction of the Hiwassee Railroad was stalled by lack of funding amidst continued sectional bickering. The Hiwassee was rechartered as the East Tennessee and Georgia Railroad in 1847, and construction finally began the following year. The first train rolled into Knoxville on June 22, 1855, to great fanfare.

With the arrival of the railroad, Knoxville expanded rapidly. The city's northern boundary extended northward to absorb the tracks, and its population grew from just over 2,000 in 1850 to about 5,300 in 1860. Local crop prices spiked, the number of wholesaling firms in Knoxville grew from 4 to 14, and two new factories— the Knoxville Manufacturing Company, which made steam engines, and Shepard, Leeds and Hoyt, which built railroad cars— were established. In 1859, the city had four hotels, at least seven factories, six churches, three newspapers, four banks, and over 45 stores.

== Secession crisis in Knoxville ==
=== Antebellum Politics in Knoxville ===
Early-19th century Knoxville was often caught in the middle of the sectionalist fighting between East Tennessee and the state as a whole. Following the presidential election of 1836, in which Knoxvillian Hugh Lawson White (James White's son) ran against Andrew Jackson's hand-picked successor, Martin Van Buren, political divisions in the city manifested along Whig (anti-Jackson) and Democratic party lines. In 1839, W.B.A. Ramsey won the city's first popular mayoral election by a single vote, illustrating how strong these divisions had become.

In 1849, William G. "Parson" Brownlow moved his radical Whig newspaper, the Whig, to Knoxville. Brownlow's editorial style, which often involved vicious personal attacks, intensified the already-sharp political divisions within the city. In 1857, he quarreled with the pro-Secession Southern Citizen and its publishers, Knoxville businessman William G. Swan and Irish Patriot John Mitchell (then in exile), to the point of threatening Swan with a pistol. Brownlow's attacks drove Whig-turned-Democrat John Hervey Crozier from public life, and forced two directors of the failed Bank of East Tennessee, A.R. Crozier and William Churchwell, to flee town. He brought charges of swindling against a third director, J.G.M. Ramsey, the former railroad promoter and a staunch Democrat.

Following the nationwide collapse of the Whig Party in 1854, many of Knoxville's Whigs, including Brownlow, were unwilling to support the new Republican Party formed by northern Whigs, and instead aligned themselves with the anti-immigrant American Party (commonly called the "Know Nothings"). When this movement disintegrated, Knoxville's ex-Whigs turned to the Opposition Party. In 1858, Opposition Party candidate Horace Maynard, with Brownlow's endorsement, soundly defeated Democratic candidate J.C. Ramsey (J.G.M. Ramsey's son) for the 2nd district's congressional seat.

=== Knoxville and Slavery ===
By 1860, slaves comprised 22% of Knoxville's population, which was higher than the percentage across East Tennessee (approximately 10%) but lower than the rest of the South (about one-third). Most of Knox County's farms were small (only one was larger than 1,000 acres (4.0 km^{2})) and typically focused on livestock or other products that weren't labor-intensive. The city was home to a chapter of the American Colonization Society, led by St. John's Episcopal Church rector Thomas William Humes.

While Knoxville was far less dependent on slavery than the rest of the South, most of the city's leaders, even those who opposed secession, were pro-slavery at the onset of the Civil War. Some, such as J.G.M. Ramsey, had always been pro-slavery. However, numerous prominent Knoxvillians, including Brownlow, Oliver Perry Temple, and Horace Maynard, had been pro-emancipation in the 1830s, but, for reasons not fully understood, were pro-slavery by the 1850s.

Temple later wrote that he and others abandoned their anti-slavery stance due to the social ostracism abolitionists faced in the South. Historian Robert McKenzie, however, argues that the aggression of northern abolitionists toward Southerners pushed many Southern abolitionists toward pro-slavery views, though he points out that no one explanation neatly explains this shift. In any case, by the late-1850s, most of Knoxville's leaders were pro-slavery. The views of Brownlow and Ramsey, bitter enemies on many fronts, were virtually identical on the issue of slavery.

=== Secession debate in Knoxville ===
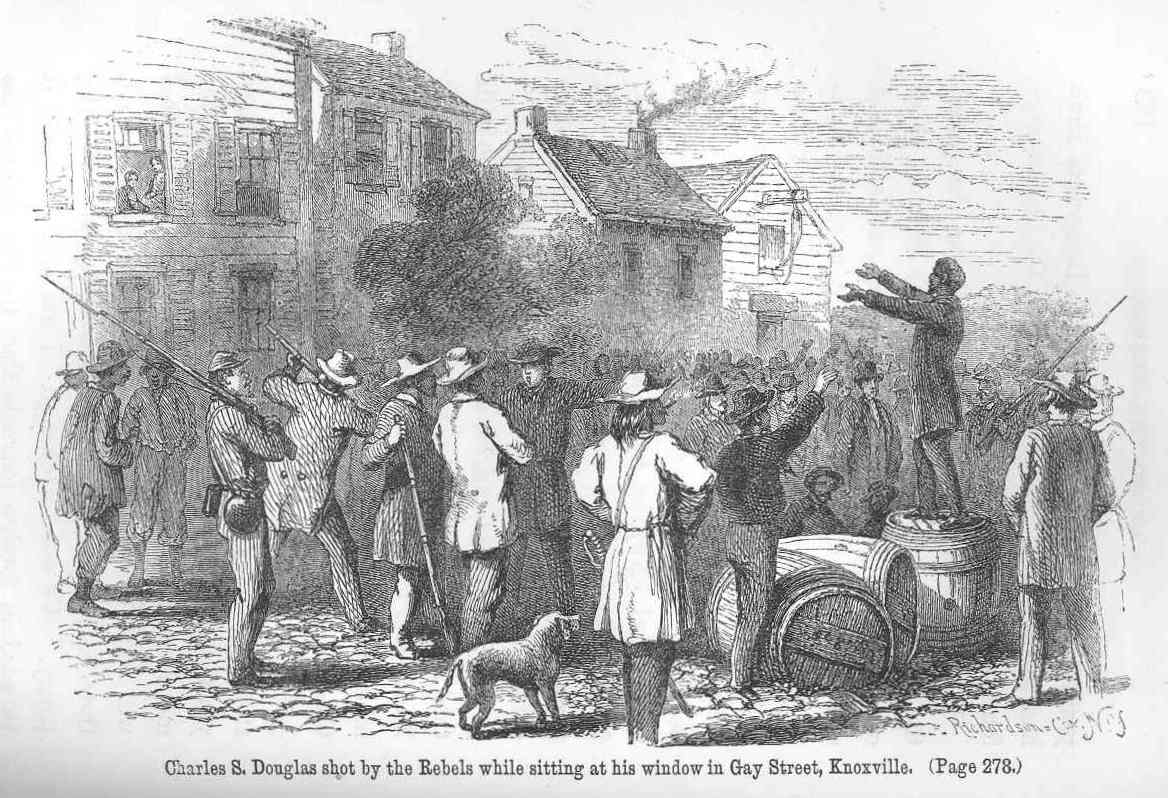
Engraving in Brownlow's Sketches, showing Confederate recruits shooting at Union supporter Charles Douglas during a Gay Street rally in April 1861

The election of Abraham Lincoln in 1860 drastically intensified the secession debate in Knoxville, and the city's leaders met on November 26 to discuss the issue. Those who favored secession, such as J.G.M. Ramsey, believed it was the only way to ensure the rights of Southerners. Those who rejected secession, such as Maynard and Temple, believed that East Tennesseans, most of whom were yeoman farmers, would be rendered subservient to a government dominated by Southern planters. In February 1861, Tennessee held a vote on whether or not to hold a statewide convention to consider seceding and joining the Confederacy. In Knoxville, 77% voted against this measure, affirming the city's allegiance to the Union.

Throughout the first half of 1861, Brownlow and J. Austin Sperry (the radical secessionist editor of the Knoxville Register) assailed one another mercilessly in their respective papers, and Union and Secessionist leaders blasted one another in speeches across the region. Simultaneous Union and Confederate recruiting rallies were held on Gay Street. Following the attack on Fort Sumter in April, Governor Isham Harris made moves to align the state with the Confederacy, prompting the region's Unionists to form the East Tennessee Convention, which met at Knoxville on May 30, 1861. The convention submitted a petition to Governor Isham Harris, calling his actions undemocratic and unconstitutional.

In a second statewide vote on June 8, 1861, a majority of East Tennesseans still rejected secession, but the measure succeeded in Middle and West Tennessee, and the state thus joined the Confederacy. In Knoxville, the vote was 777 to 377 in favor of secession. McKenzie points out, however, that 436 Confederate soldiers from outside Knox County were stationed in Knoxville at the time and were allowed to vote. If these votes are removed, the tally in Knoxville was 377 to 341 against secession. Following the vote, the East Tennessee Union Convention petitioned the state legislature, asking that East Tennessee be allowed to form a separate, Union-aligned state. The petition was rejected, however, and Governor Harris ordered Confederate troops into the region.

== Civil War ==
=== Confederate Occupation ===
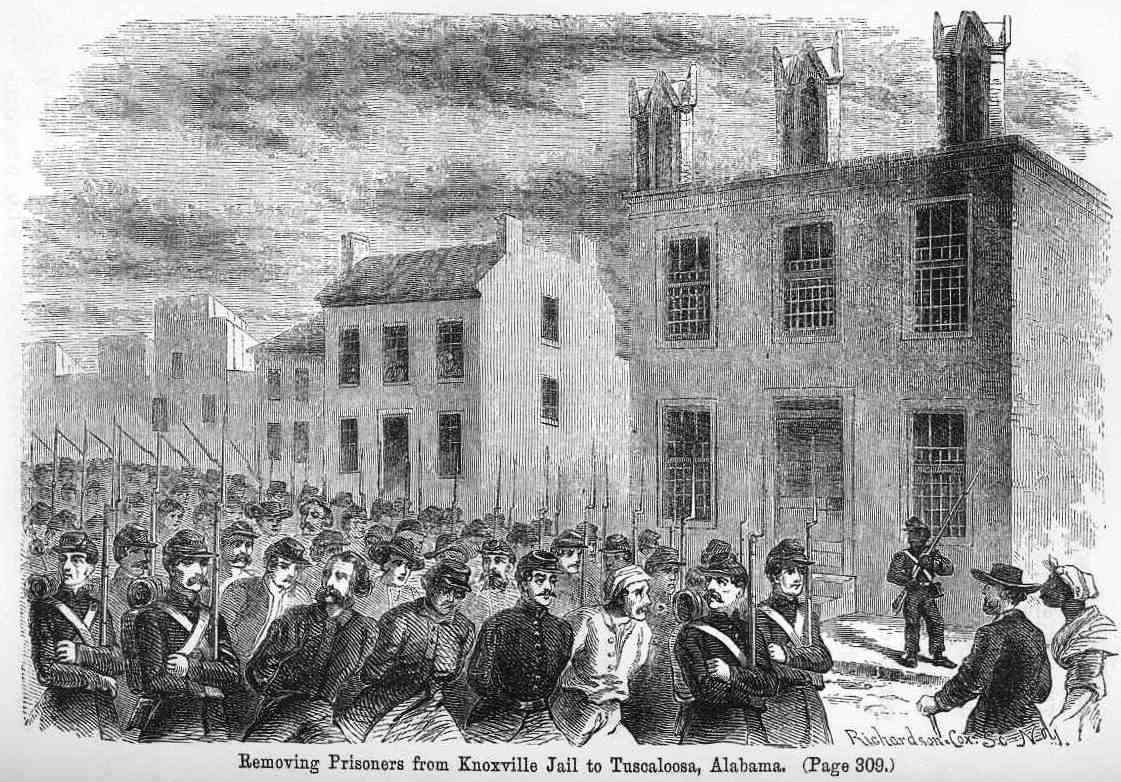
Engraving from Brownlow's Sketches, showing Confederate soldiers marching Union prisoners through the streets of Knoxville in December 1861

The Confederate commander in East Tennessee, Felix Zollicoffer, initially took a lenient stance toward the region's Unionists. In November 1861, however, Union guerrillas destroyed several railroad bridges across East Tennessee, prompting Confederate authorities to institute martial law. Suspected bridge-burning conspirators were tried and executed, and hundreds of other Unionists were jailed, causing the county jail at the southwestern corner of Main and Walnut streets to become overcrowded with prisoners. Brownlow was among those arrested, but was released after a few weeks. He spent 1862 touring the north in an attempt to rally support for a Union invasion of East Tennessee.

Zollicoffer was replaced by John Crittenden in November 1861, and Crittenden was in turn replaced by Edmund Kirby Smith in March 1862, as Confederate authorities consistently struggled to find an acceptable commander for its East Tennessee forces. In June 1862, George Wilson, one of Andrews' Raiders, was tried and convicted in Knoxville. In July 1862, 40 Union soldiers captured by Nathan Bedford Forrest near Murfreesboro were marched down Gay Street, with Confederate soldiers jokingly reading aloud their personal correspondence afterward.

The divided 2nd District sent representatives to both the U.S. Congress (Horace Maynard) and the Confederate Congress (William G. Swan) in 1861. Maynard, along with fellow East Tennessee Unionist Andrew Johnson, consistently pleaded with President Lincoln to send troops into the region. For nearly two years, however, Union generals in Kentucky consistently ignored orders to march on Knoxville, and instead focused on Middle Tennessee. On June 20, 1863, William P. Sanders's Union cavalry briefly laid siege to Knoxville, but a Confederate citizens' guard within the city managed to fend them off.

=== Union Occupation ===
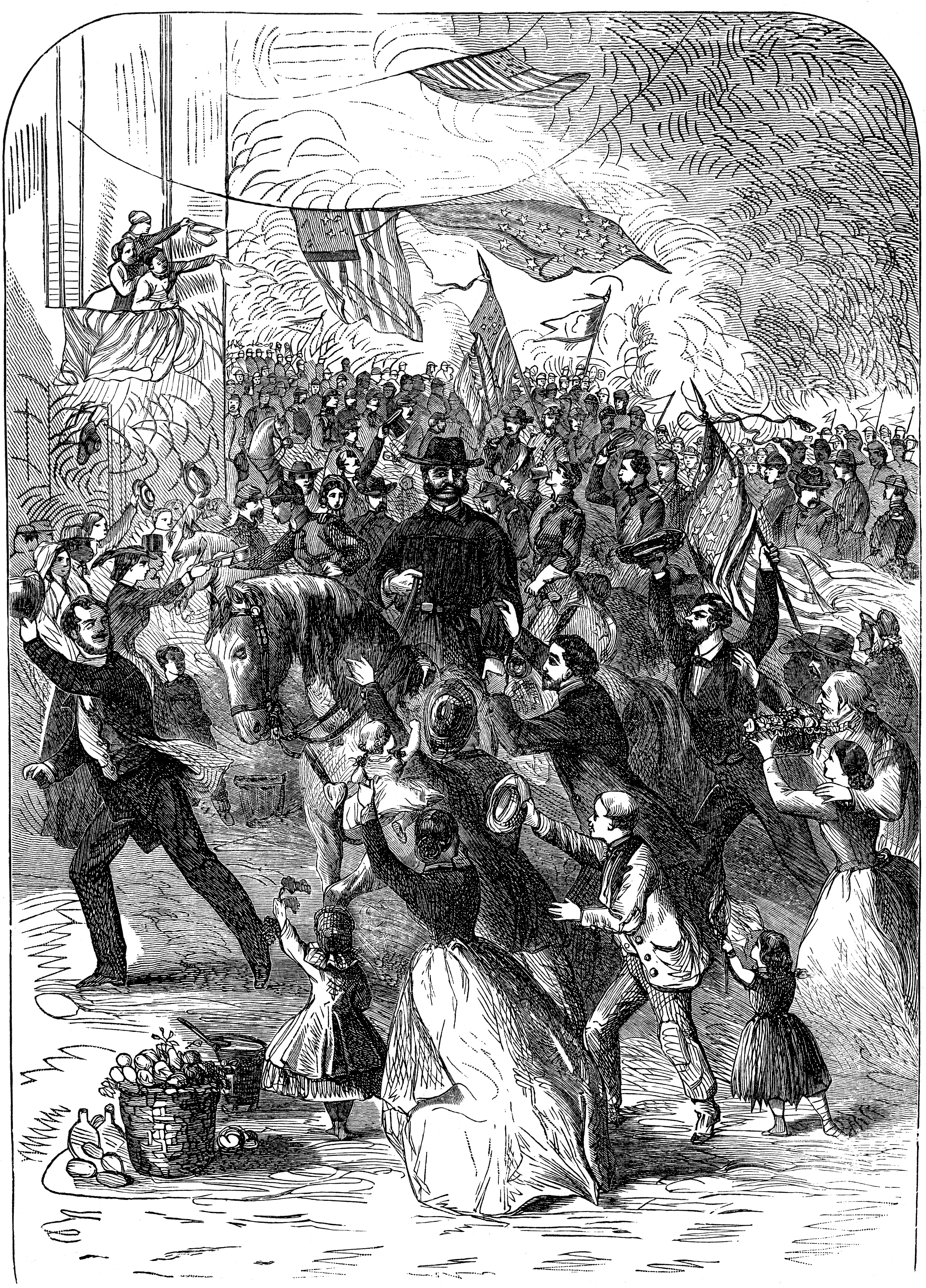
Harper's Weekly illustration showing Knoxville Unionists welcoming General Ambrose Burnside into the city in September 1863

In August 1863, Simon Buckner, the last of a string of Confederate commanders based in Knoxville, evacuated the city. On September 1, the vanguard of Union general Ambrose Burnside entered the city to great fanfare (the unit briefly chased future mayor Peter Staub through the streets). Oliver Perry Temple joyously ran behind the soldiers the length of Gay Street, and pro-Union Mayor James C. Luttrell raised a large American flag he had saved for the occasion. Burnside set up his headquarters at John Hervey Crozier's house at the corner of Gay and Union. Thomas William Humes was reinstalled as rector of St. John's Episcopal, and Brownlow returned to the city and once again began publication of the Whig.

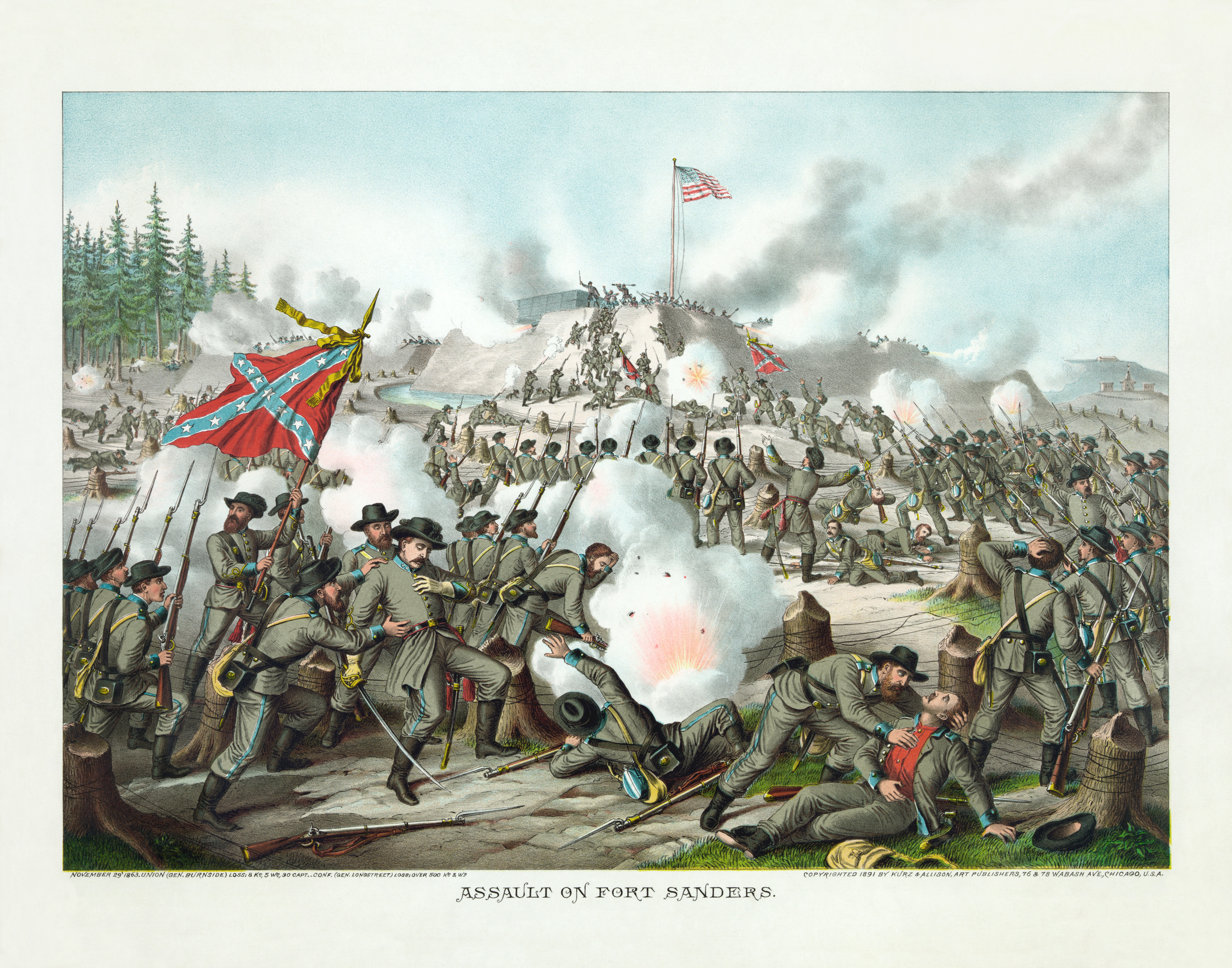
The Battle of Fort Sanders, as depicted by Kurz and Allison

Anticipating the Confederates would soon attempt to retake the city, Burnside and his chief engineer, Orlando Poe, set about fortifying the city with a string of earthworks, bastions, and trenches. In November 1863, Confederate general James Longstreet moved north from Chattanooga in hopes of forcing Burnside out of Knoxville. Burnside's forces managed to delay Longstreet at the Battle of Campbell's Station on November 16, but was forced to retreat back to Knoxville with Longstreet in pursuit. General Sanders was mortally wounded on November 18 executing a critical delaying action along Kingston Pike. Fort Loudon, one of the city's earthen bastions, was renamed "Fort Sanders" in his honor.

Longstreet's forces laid siege to Knoxville for two weeks, though the Union Army managed to resupply Burnside via the river. On the morning of November 29, 1863, Longstreet ordered his forces to attack Fort Sanders. During the Battle of Fort Sanders, the Confederate attackers struggled to overcome Union trenches and the barrage of Union gunfire, and were forced to withdraw after just 20 minutes. On December 2, Longstreet lifted the siege and withdrew to Virginia, leaving the city in Union hands until the end of the war.

=== Aftermath ===
In April 1864, the East Tennessee Union Convention reconvened in Knoxville, and while its delegates were badly divided, several, including Brownlow and Maynard, supported a resolution recognizing the Emancipation Proclamation. Confederate businessman Joseph Mabry and future business leaders such as Charles McClung McGhee and Peter Kern began working with Union leaders to rebuild the city. Brownlow remained vengeful, however, seizing the property of Confederate leaders J.G.M. Ramsey, William Sneed (including the Lamar House Hotel), and William Swan, and expelling known Confederate sympathizers from the city.

Acts of Civil War-related violence occurred in Knoxville for years after the war. On September 4, 1865, Confederate soldier Abner Baker was lynched in Knoxville after killing a Union soldier who had killed his father. On July 10, 1868, Union major E.C. Camp shot and killed Confederate colonel Henry Ashby on Main Street in front of the courthouse over a Civil War grievance. On June 13, 1870, Joseph Mabry shot pro-Union attorney John Baxter in front of the Lamar House, capping a feud that had been building since the war. The following year, David Nelson, the son of pro-Union congressman T.A.R. Nelson, shot and killed Confederate general James Holt Clanton on Gay Street in front of the Lamar House.

== Knoxville and the rise of the New South (1866–1920) ==
=== Economic Growth ===
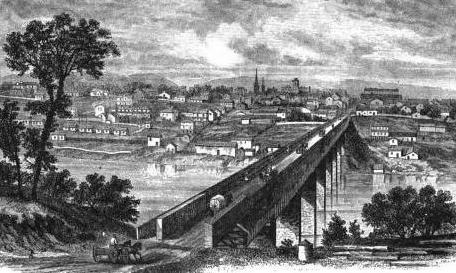
View across the first Gay Street Bridge in the late 1860s; the bridge shown was eventually destroyed by a flood

According to historian William MacArthur, Knoxville "grew from a town to a city between 1870 and 1900." A number of newcomers from the North, with the help of prewar local business elites, quickly established the city's first heavy industries. Hiram Chamberlain and the Welsh-born Richards brothers established the Knoxville Iron Company in 1868, and erected a large mill in the Second Creek Valley. The following year, Charles McClung McGhee and several investors purchased the city's two major railroads and merged them into the East Tennessee, Virginia and Georgia Railway, which would eventually control over 2,500 miles (4,000 km) of tracks in five states. The city's textile industry took shape with the establishment of the Knoxville Woolen Mills and Brookside Mills in 1884 and 1885, respectively.

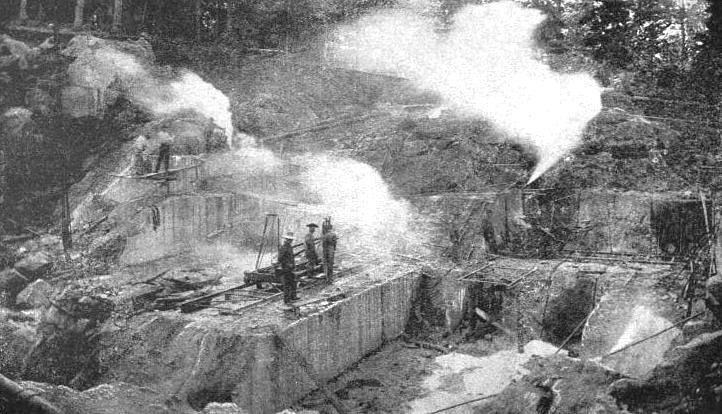
Mead's Quarry in South Knoxville, photographed circa 1890

As one of the largest cities in the Southern Appalachian region, Knoxville had long been a nexus between the surrounding rural mountain hinterland and the major industrial centers of the North, and thus had long been home to a thriving wholesaling (or "jobbing") market. Rural merchants from across East Tennessee purchased goods for their general stores from Knoxville wholesalers. With the arrival of the railroad, the city's wholesaling sector expanded rapidly, with over a dozen firms in operation by 1860, and 50 by 1896. In 1866, Knoxville-based wholesaler Cowan, McClung and Company was the most profitable company in the state. By the late-1890s, Knoxville had the third-largest wholesaling market in the South.

The railroad also led to a boom in the quarrying and production of Tennessee marble, a type of crystalline limestone found in abundance in the ridges surrounding Knoxville. By the early 1890s, twenty-two quarries and three finishing mills were in operation in Knox County alone, and the industry as a whole was generating over a million dollars in annual profits. Tennessee marble was used in monumental construction projects across the nation, earning Knoxville the nickname, "The Marble City," during the late 19th century. The Flag of Knoxville, Tennessee incorporates the color white to symbolize marble and displays a derrick used in marble mining.

=== Demographic Changes ===
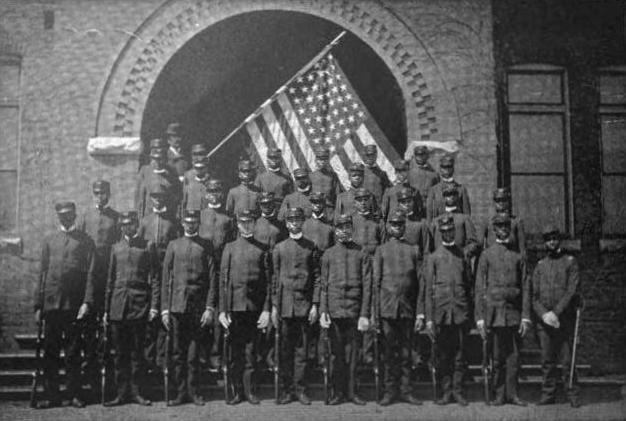
Army cadets at Knoxville College, circa 1903

Knoxville's pre-1850s population consisted primarily of European-American (of mostly English, Scots-Irish, or German descent) Protestants and a small community of free blacks and slaves. Railroad construction in the 1850s brought to the city large numbers of Irish Catholic immigrants, who helped establish the city's first Catholic congregation in 1855. The Swiss were another important group in 19th-century Knoxville, with businessmen James G. Sterchi and Peter Staub, Supreme Court justice Edward Terry Sanford, philosopher Albert Chavannes, and builder David Getaz, all claiming descent from the city's Swiss immigrants. Welsh immigrants brought mining and metallurgical expertise to the city in the late 1860s and 1870s.

After the Civil War, African Americans, both freed slaves and blacks that had been free prior to the war, played an increasing role in the city's political and economic affairs. Racetrack and saloon owner Cal Johnson, born a slave, was one of the wealthiest African Americans in the state by the time of his death. Attorney William F. Yardley, a member of the city's free black community, was Tennessee's first black gubernatorial candidate in 1876. Knoxville College was founded in 1875 to provide educational opportunities for the city's black community.

Greek immigrants began arriving in Knoxville in significant numbers in the early 20th century. Knoxville's Greek community is perhaps best known for its restaurateurs, namely the Regas family, who operated a restaurant on North Gay Street from 1919 to 2010, and the Paskalis family, who founded the Gold Sun Cafe on Market Square around 1909. Notable members of Knoxville's Jewish community included jeweler Max Friedman and department store owner Max Arnstein. One of Knoxville's largest migrant groups consisted of rural people who moved to the city from the surrounding rural counties, often seeking wage-paying jobs in mills. Many of Knoxville's political and business leaders throughout the 20th century hailed from rural areas of Southern Appalachia.

=== Knoxville in the Gilded Age ===
Swiss immigrant Peter Staub built Knoxville's first opera house, Staub's Theatre, on Gay Street in 1872. This was also one of the first major structures designed by architect Joseph Baumann, who would design many of the city's more prominent late-19th-century buildings. During this same period, the Lamar House Hotel, located across the street from the theater, was a popular gathering place for the city's elite. The hotel hosted lavish masquerade balls, and served oysters, cigars, and imported wines.

Initially a place for farmers to sell produce, Market Square had evolved into one of the city's commercial and cultural centers by the 1870s. The square's most notable business was Peter Kern's ice cream saloon and confections factory, which hosted numerous festivals for various groups in the late 19th century. The square also attracted street preachers, early country musicians, and political activists. Women's suffragist Lizzie Crozier French was delivering speeches on Market Square as early as the 1880s.

After the Civil War, Thomas William Humes was named president of East Tennessee University (renamed the University of Tennessee in 1879), and managed to acquire for the institution the state's Morrill Act land-grant funds, allowing the school to expand. In 1886, Charles McClung McGhee established the Lawson McGhee Library, named for his late daughter, which became the basis of Knox County's public library system. In 1873, Humes managed to obtain a Peabody Fund grant that allowed Knoxville to establish a public school system.

=== Expansion (1869–1917) ===
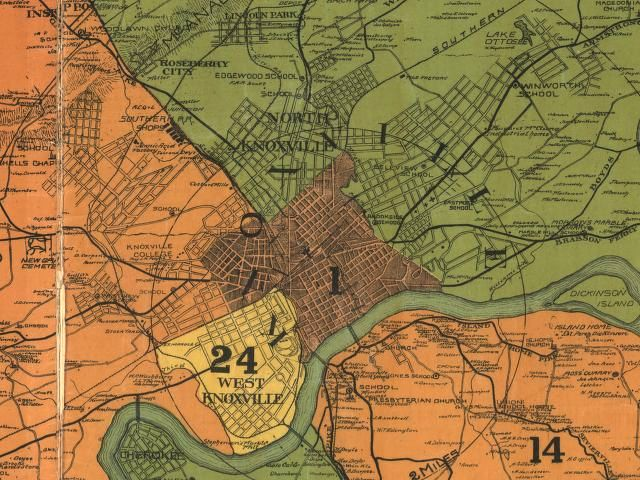
Knoxville in 1895, with North Knoxville and West Knoxville, which were separate cities until 1897

Knoxville's first major annexation following the Civil War came in 1869, when it annexed the city of East Knoxville, an area east of First Creek that had incorporated in 1856. In 1883, Knoxville annexed Mechanicsville, which had developed just northwest of the city as a village for Knoxville Iron Company and other factory workers. In the 1870s and 1880s, the development of Knoxville's streetcar system (electrified by William Gibbs McAdoo in 1890) led to the rapid development of suburbs on the city's periphery. Neighborhoods such as Fort Sanders, Fourth and Gill, Old North Knoxville, Happy Holler, and Parkridge, are all rooted in "streetcar suburbs" developed during this period.

In 1888, the area now consisting of Fort Sanders and the UT campus were incorporated as the City of West Knoxville, and in 1889, the area now consisting of Old North Knoxville and Fourth and Gill incorporated as the City of North Knoxville. Knoxville annexed both in 1897. In 1907, Parkridge, Chilhowee Park, and adjacent neighborhoods incorporated as Park City. Lonsdale, a factory village northwest of the city, and Mountain View, located south of Park City, incorporated that same year. Oakwood, which developed alongside the Southern Railway's Coster rail yard, was incorporated in 1913. In 1917, Knoxville annexed these four cities, along with the burgeoning suburb of Sequoyah Hills and parts of South Knoxville, effectively more than doubling the city's population, and increasing its land area from 4 to 26 square miles (10 to 67 km^{2}).

As Knoxville grew, the city's boosters continuously touted the city as an industrial boom town in an attempt to lure major companies. In 1910 and 1911, two major national fairs, the Appalachian Expositions, were held at Chilhowee Park. A third, the National Conservation Exposition, was held in 1913. The fairs demonstrated the economic trend known as the "New South," the transition of the South from an agricultural-based economy to an industrial one. The fairs also advocated the responsible usage of the region's natural resources.

=== Urban Issues ===
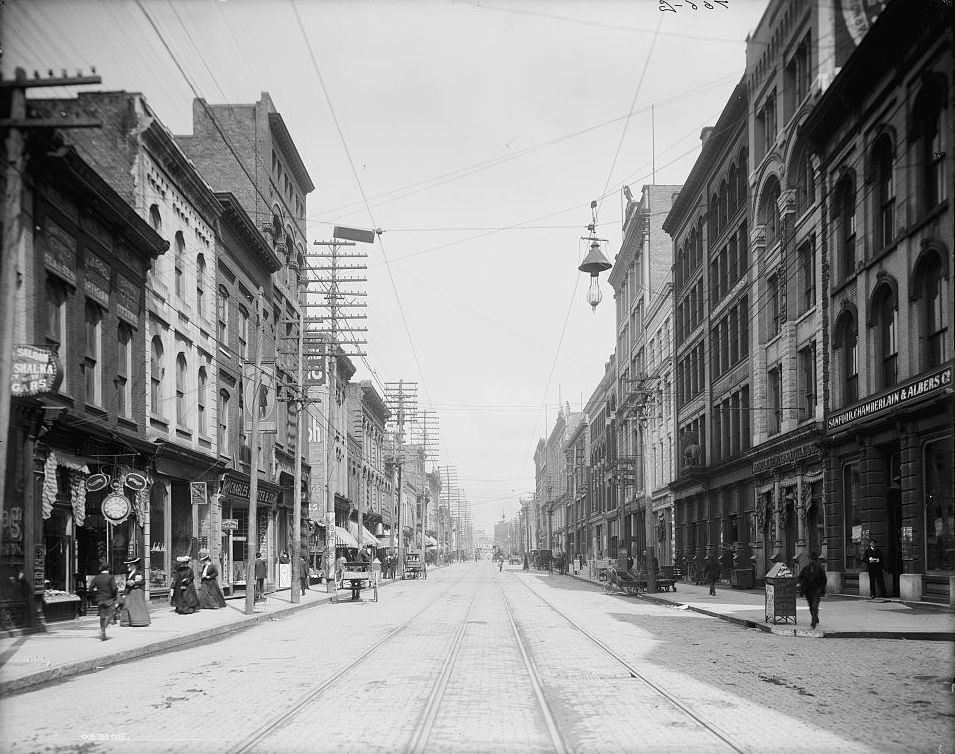
Gay Street, photographed by the Detroit Publishing Company in the early 1900s

Knoxville's rapid growth in the late 19th century led to increased pollution, mainly from the increasing use of coal, and a rise in the crime rate, exacerbated by the influx of large numbers of people with very low-paying jobs. The city, which had suffered serious cholera outbreaks in 1849, 1854, 1866, and 1873, and smallpox epidemics in 1850, 1855, 1862, 1863, 1864, and 1866, created a health department in 1879, and established a city hospital in 1883. Activists such as Lizzie Crozier French and businessmen such as E.C. Camp established organizations that helped the poor.

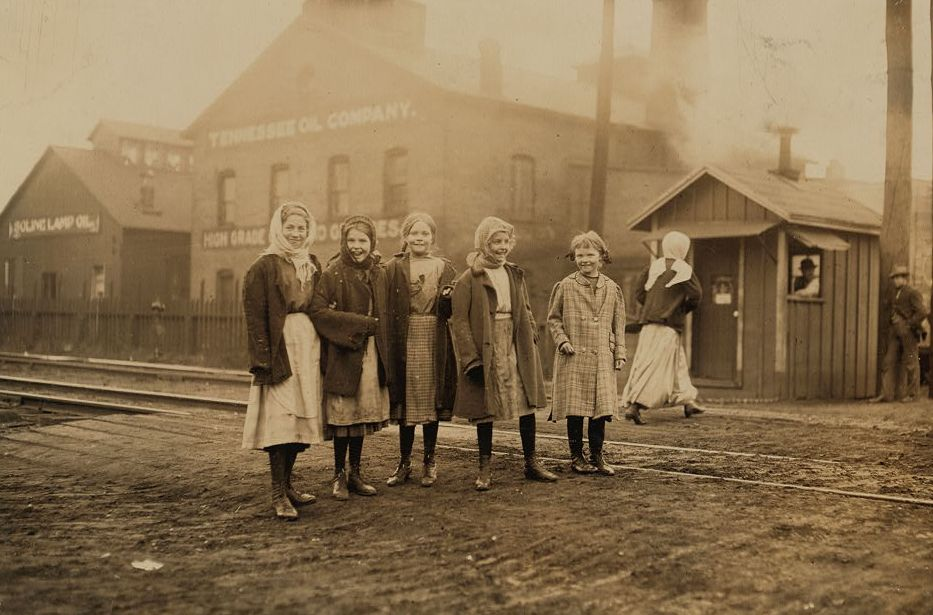
Child workers at Knoxville's Brookside Mills, photographed by Lewis Hine in 1910

By the 1880s, Knoxville had a murder rate that was higher than Los Angeles's murder rate in the 1990s. Journalist Jack Neely points out that "saloons, whorehouses, cocaine parlors, gambling dens, and poolrooms" lined Central Street from the railroad tracks to the river. High-profile shootouts were not uncommon, the most well-known being the Mabry-O'Connor shootout on Gay Street, which left banker Thomas O'Connor, businessman Joseph Mabry, and Mabry's son, dead in 1882. In 1901, Kid Curry, a member of Butch Cassidy's Wild Bunch, shot and killed two police officers at Ike Jones's Bar on Central. The Kid Curry shooting helped fuel calls for citywide prohibition, which was enacted in 1907.

After World War I, the United States suffered a major economic recession, and Knoxville, like many other cities, experienced an influx of migrants moving to the city in search of work. Racial tensions heightened as poor whites and blacks competed for the few available jobs, and both the Ku Klux Klan and the National Association for the Advancement of Colored People (NAACP) opened chapters in the city. On August 30, 1919, these tensions erupted in the so-called Riot of 1919, the city's worst race riot, which shattered the city's vision of itself as a racially tolerant Southern town.

== Transition to a modern city (1920–1960) ==
=== Louis Brownlow ===
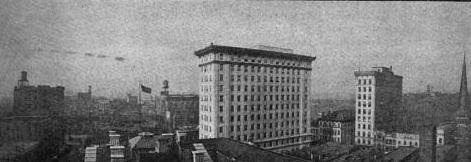
The Holston and Burwell buildings dominated Knoxville's skyline in 1919

In 1912, Knoxvillians replaced their mayor-alderman form of government with a commissioner form of government that consisted of five commissioners elected at-large, and a mayor chosen from among the five. Following the 1917 annexations, the city began to struggle as it extended services to the newly annexed areas, and it became clear the new government was ineffective at dealing with the city's financial issues. In 1923, the city voted to replace the commissioners with a city manager-council form of government, which involved the election of a city council, who would then hire a city manager to oversee the city's business affairs.

The first city manager hired by Knoxville was Louis Brownlow, the successful city manager of Petersburg, Virginia, and a cousin of Parson Brownlow. When Brownlow arrived in Knoxville, he was horrified by the city's condition, later writing that he found "something new and more disturbing" every day. There were no paved roads connecting Knoxville with other major cities. The lone operable tank of the city's waterworks was full of cracks that Knoxvillians had been lazily plugging with gunny sacks. The city hospital was unable to buy drugs, as it was deeply in debt, and its credit had been cut off. City Hall, then located on Market Square, was filthy, noisy and disorganized.

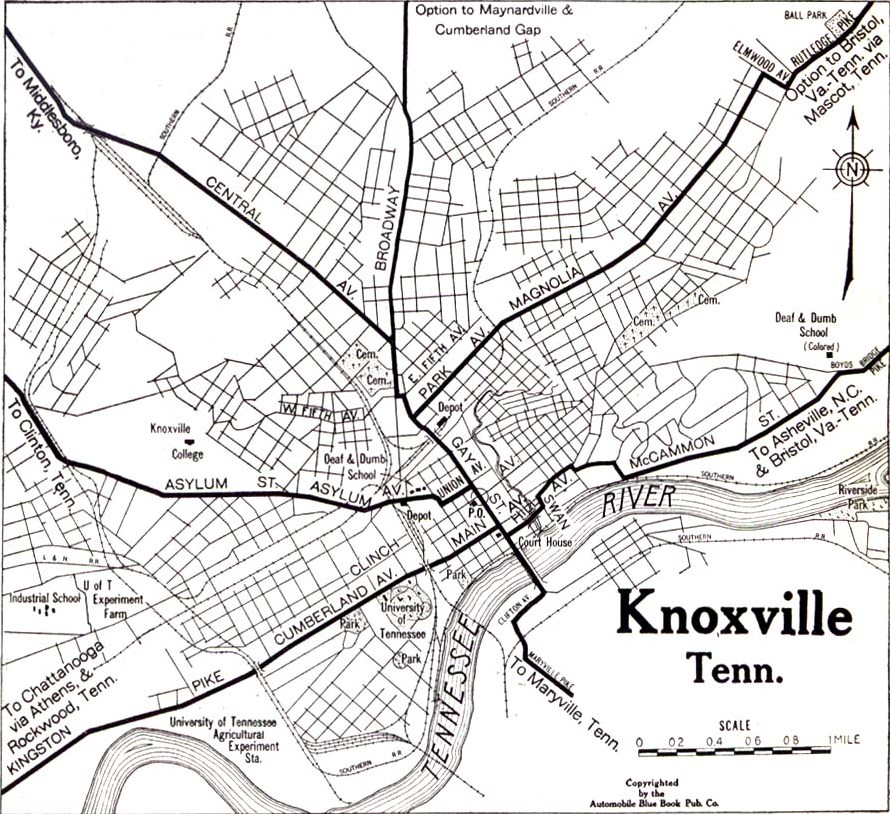
Map of Knoxville in 1919

Brownlow immediately got to work, negotiating a more favorable bond rate and ordering greater scrutiny of all purchases. He also convinced the city to purchase the vacated Tennessee School for the Deaf building for use as a city hall. While Brownlow had some initial success, his initiatives met staunch opposition from South Knoxville councilman Lee Monday, who according to Brownlow, was "representative of that top-of-the-voice screamology of East Tennessee mountain politics." Opposition to Brownlow gradually intensified, especially after he called for a tax increase, and following the election of a less-friendly city council in 1926, Brownlow resigned.

=== Economic struggles ===
While Knoxville experienced tremendous growth in the late 19th century, by the early 1900s, the city's economy was beginning to show signs of stagnation. The natural resources of the surrounding region were either exhausted or their demand fell sharply, and the decline of railroads in favor of other forms of shipping led to the collapse of the city's wholesaling sector. Population growth also declined, though this trend was masked by the 1917 annexations.

Historian Bruce Wheeler suggests that the city's overly provincial economic "elite," which had long demonstrated a disdain for change, and the masses of new rural ("Appalachian") and African-American migrants, both of whom were suspicious of government, formed an odd alliance that consistently rejected major attempts at reform. As Knoxvillians were adamantly opposed to tax increases, the city consistently had to rely on bond issues to pay for city services. An increasingly greater portion of existing revenues was required to pay interest on these bonds, leaving little money for civic improvements. Urban neighborhoods fell into ruin and the downtown area deteriorated. Those who could afford it fled to new suburbs on the city's periphery, such as Sequoyah Hills, Lindbergh Forest, or North Hills.

During the Great Depression, Knoxville's six largest banks either failed or were forced into mergers. Construction fell 70%, and unemployment tripled. African Americans were hit hardest, as business owners began hiring whites for jobs traditionally held by black workers, such as bakers, telephone workers, and road pavers. The city was forced pay its employees in scrip, and begged creditors to allow it to refinance its debt.

=== Federal programs and infrastructure growth ===
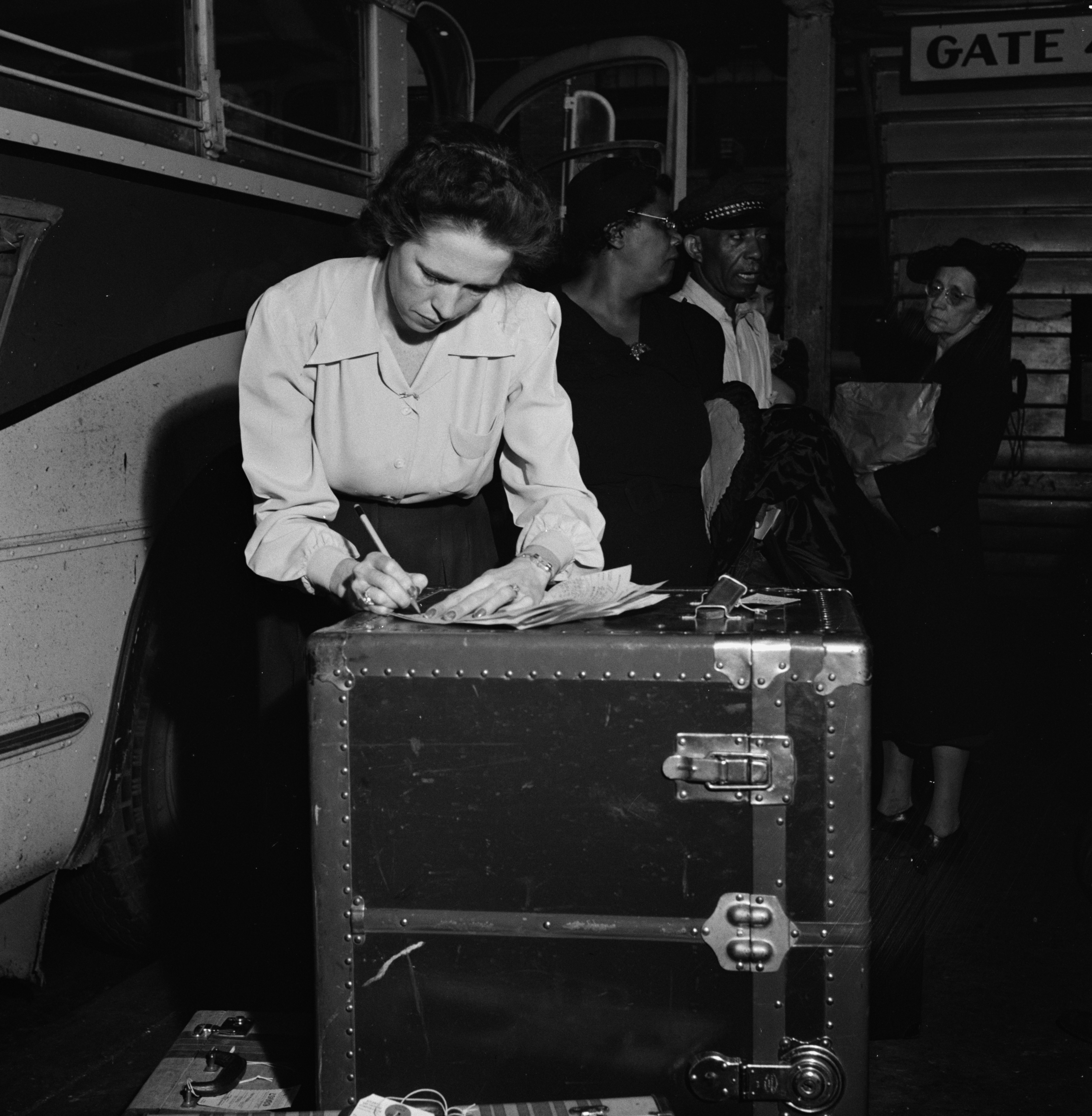
Tennessee Coach Company baggage agent in Knoxville, photographed by Esther Bubley in 1943

In the 1930s and early 1940s, several major federal programs provided some relief to Knoxvillians suffering amidst the Depression. The Great Smoky Mountains National Park, which wealthy Knoxvillians had led the drive to create, opened in 1932. In 1933, the Tennessee Valley Authority (TVA) was established with its headquarters in Knoxville, its initial purpose being to control flooding and improve navigation in the Tennessee River watershed, and provide electricity to the area. During World War II, the construction of Manhattan Project facilities in nearby Oak Ridge brought thousands of federal workers to the area, and helped boost Knoxville's economy.

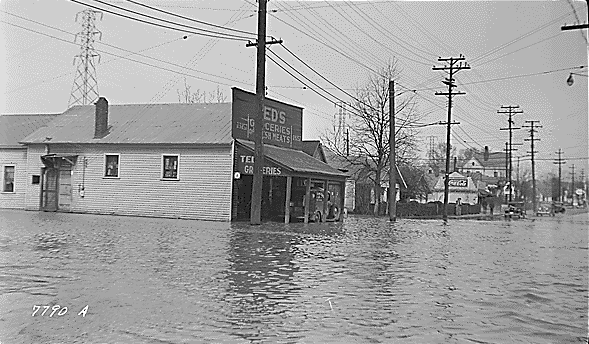
First Creek floodwaters at 6th and Washington, photographed in 1938. Dam construction by TVA in the 1930s and 1940s helped alleviate flooding in the Tennessee Valley.

Kingston Pike saw a boom in tourism in the 1930s and 1940s as it lay along a merged stretch of two cross-country tourism routes, the Dixie Highway and the Lee Highway. During the same period, traffic to the Smokies led to development along Chapman Highway (named for the park's chief promoter, David Chapman) in South Knoxville. In the late 1920s, General Lawrence Tyson donated land off Kingston Pike for McGhee Tyson Airport, named for his son, World War I aviator Charles McGhee Tyson (the airport has since moved to Blount County). In 1947, Knoxville replaced its streetcar system with buses. TVA's completion of Fort Loudoun Dam in 1943 brought modifications to Knoxville's riverfront.

In 1946, travel writer John Gunther visited Knoxville, and dubbed the city, the "ugliest city" in America. He also mocked its puritanical laws regarding liquor sales and the showing of movies on Sunday, and noted the city's relatively high crime rate. While Knoxvillians vigorously defended their city, Gunther's comments nevertheless sparked discussions regarding the city's unsightliness and its blue laws. The ordinance forbidding the showing of movies on Sunday was done away with in 1946, with the help of the state legislature. Knoxville legalized packaged liquor in 1961, though the issue remained a contentious one for years.

=== Political factionalism and metropolitan government ===
The decades following the tumultuous term of Louis Brownlow saw continuous fighting in Knoxville's city council over virtually every major issue. In 1941, Cas Walker, the owner of a grocery store chain and host of a popular local radio (and later television) program, was elected to the city council. A successor of sorts to Monday, Walker vehemently opposed every progressive measure introduced in the city council during his 30-year tenure, including fluoridation of the city's water supply, adoption of daylight saving time, library construction, parking meters, and metropolitan government. He also adamantly opposed any attempt to increase taxes. Walker's brash and uncompromising style made him a folk hero to many, especially the city's working class and poor.

Knoxville's economy continued to struggle following World War II. The city's textile industry collapsed in the mid-1950s with the closure of Appalachian Mills, Cherokee Mills, Venus Hosiery, and Brookside Mills, leaving thousands unemployed. Major companies refused to build new factories in Knoxville due to a lack of suitable industrial sites. Between 1956 and 1961, 35 companies inquired into establishing major operations in Knoxville, but all 35 chose cities with better-developed industrial parks. In 1961, Mayor John Duncan called for a bond issue to develop a new industrial site, but voters rejected the measure.

As early as the 1930s, leaders in Knoxville and Knox County had pondered forming a metropolitan government. In the late 1950s, the issue gained momentum, with the support of many city and county officials, and the city's two major newspapers, the News-Sentinel and the Journal. Cas Walker, however, blasted the idea of a metropolitan government as a communist plot, and his old political rival, George Dempster, also rejected the idea. When the measure was presented to voters in 1959, it was soundly defeated, with just 21% of Knoxvillians and 13.8% of Knox Countians supporting it.

== Revitalization (1960–present) ==
=== Knoxville in the 1960s ===
In 1960, several Knoxville College students, led by Robert Booker and Avon Rollins, engaged in a series of sit-ins to protest segregation at lunch counters in Downtown Knoxville. This action prompted downtown department stores to desegregate, and by the end of the decade, most other downtown businesses had followed suit. City schools also gradually desegregated during this period, largely in response to a lawsuit brought by Josephine Goss in 1959.

Between 1945 and 1975, the University of Tennessee's student body grew from just under 3,000 to nearly 30,000. The school's campus expanded to cover the entire area between Cumberland Avenue and the river west of Second Creek, and the Fort Sanders neighborhood was largely converted into student housing. By the mid-1970s, U.T. employed over 4,000 faculty and staff, providing a boost to the city's economy. The growing popularity of the school's sports teams led to the expansion of Neyland Stadium, one of the largest non-racing stadiums in the nation, and the eventual construction of Thompson–Boling Arena, one of the largest basketball venues in the nation at the time of its completion.

While unemployment declined to just 2.8% in the 1960s, many of the jobs paid low wages, stunting the growth of the city's service sector. Large parts of the downtown area continued to deteriorate, and nearly half of all houses in the city's older neighborhoods were considered substandard and in a critical state of decline. A nationwide survey ranked the Mountain View area of East Knoxville 20,875 out of 20,915 urban neighborhoods in terms of housing stock, and President Lyndon Johnson referred to the residents of Mountain View as "people as poverty-ridden as I have seen in any part of the United States."

=== Downtown revitalization efforts ===
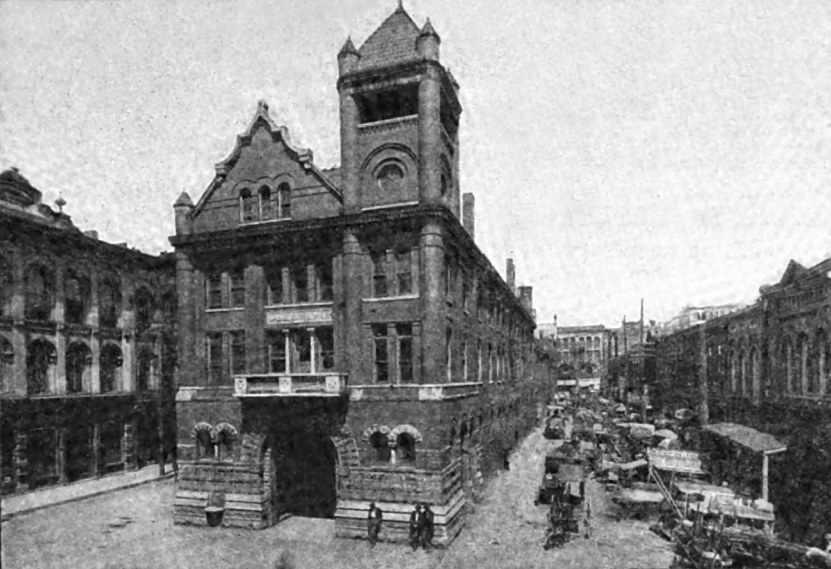
The Market House on Market Square, constructed in 1897 and demolished in 1960

Beginning in the 1950s, Knoxville made serious efforts to reinvigorate the downtown area. One of the city's first major renovation efforts involved the replacement of the large Market House on Market Square with a pedestrian mall. The city also made numerous attempts to lure shoppers back to Gay Street, starting with the Downtown Promenade in 1960, in which walkways were constructed behind buildings along the street's eastern half, and continuing with the so-called "Gay Way," which included the widening of sidewalks and the installation of storefront canopies, in 1964. Downtown retailers continued to slip, however, and with the completion of West Town Mall in 1972, the downtown retail market collapsed. Miller's, Kress's, and the three surviving downtown theaters had all closed by 1978.

In 1962, Knoxville annexed several large communities, namely Fountain City and Inskip north of the city, and Bearden and West Hills west of the city. This brought large numbers of progressive voters into the city, diluting the influence of Cas Walker and his allies. In the early 1970s, Mayor Kyle Testerman, backed by a more open city council, implemented the "1990 Plan," which essentially abandoned attempts to lure large retailers back to the downtown area, aiming instead to create a financial district accompanied by neighborhoods containing a mixture of residences, office space, and specialty shops.

In 1978, Knoxville and Knox County voters again voted on the issue of metropolitan government. In spite of support by U.T. president Edward Boling, Mayor Randy Tyree (Testerman's successor), Pilot president Jim Haslam, Knoxville Superintendent of Schools Mildred Doyle, and Knox County judge Howard Bozeman, the initiative again failed. While a majority of Knoxvillians had voted in favor of consolidated government, a majority of Knox Countians had voted against it.

=== 1982 World's Fair ===
In 1974, Downtown Knoxville Association president Stewart Evans, following a discussion with King Cole, president of the 1974 Spokane Exposition, raised the possibility of a similar international exposition for Knoxville. Testerman and Tyree both embraced the fair, though the city council and Knoxvillians in general were initially lukewarm to the idea. One key supporter of the fair was rogue banker Jake Butcher, who in 1975 seized control of Knoxville's largest bank, Hamilton National, and shook up the city's conservative banking community. Following his failed gubernatorial campaign in 1978, Butcher turned his attention to the fair initiative, and helped the city raise critical funding.

To prepare for the World's Fair, the merged stretch of I-40 and I-75 in West Knoxville was widened, and I-640 was constructed. The old L&N yard along Second Creek, home to a rough neighborhood known as "Scuffletown," was chosen for the fair site, largely for its redevelopment potential. Three hotel chains— Radisson, Hilton, and Holiday Inn— built large hotels in the downtown area in anticipation of the influx of fair visitors. The fair, officially named the International Energy Exposition, was open from May 1 to October 31, 1982, and drew over 11 million visitors. Its success defied the expectations of the Wall Street Journal, which had derided Knoxville as a "scruffy little town," and had predicted the fair would fail.

While the fair was profitable, it nevertheless left Knoxville in debt, and failed to spark the redevelopment boom Testerman, Tyree, and the fair's promoters had envisioned. Furthermore, on the day after the fair closed, the FDIC raided all of Butcher's banks, leading to the collapse of his banking empire, and threatening the city's financial stability. Testerman replaced an embattled Tyree as mayor in 1983, and attempted to reinvigorate interest in his downtown redevelopment plans.

=== 1980s, 1990s and 2000s ===
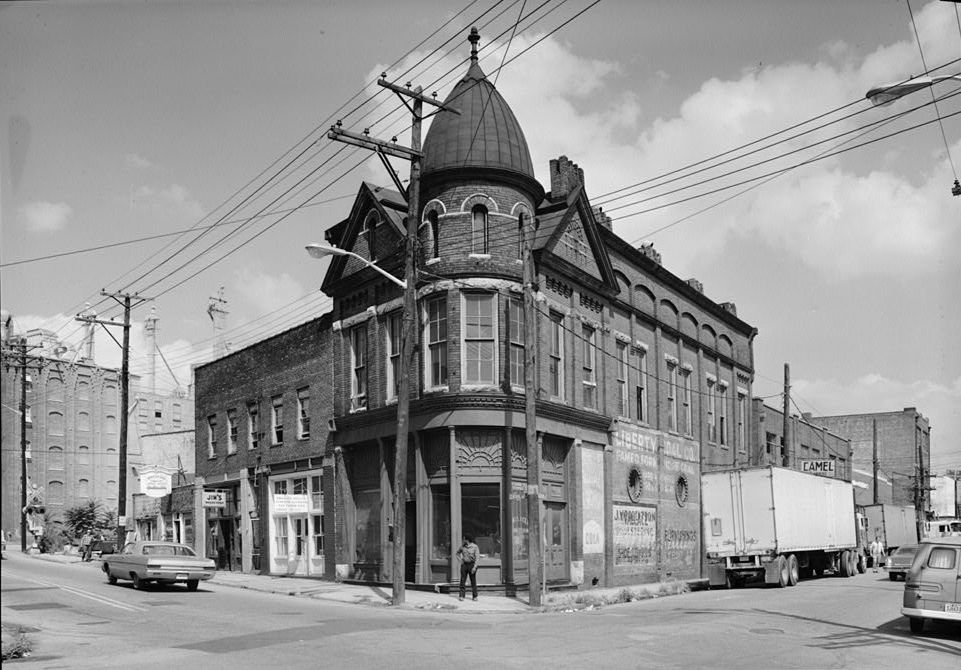
Sullivan's Saloon, photographed by Jack Boucher in 1976, following years of deterioration; this building was one of first to be renovated by developer Kristopher Kendrick

The second Testerman administration stabilized the city's finances, initiated urban renewal projects in Mechanicsville and East Knoxville, and consolidated Knoxville City and Knox County schools. With the help of rising entrepreneur Chris Whittle, Testerman came up with an updated downtown redevelopment plan, the "1987 Downtown Plan." This new plan called for further renovations to Market Square and the beautification of Gay Street.

Victor Ashe, Testerman's successor, continued redevelopment efforts, focusing mainly on parks and blighted areas of East and North Knoxville. As the city's westward expansion along Kingston Pike had been thwarted by the incorporation of Farragut as a town in 1980, Ashe, rather than focus on large-scale annexations, turned instead to "finger" annexations, which involved annexing small parcels of land at a time. Ashe would make hundreds of such annexations during his 16-year tenure, effectively expanding the city by over 25 square miles. Preservation efforts in Knoxville, which have preserved historic structures such as Blount Mansion, the Bijou Theatre, and the Tennessee Theatre, have intensified in recent years, prompting the designation of numerous historic overlay districts throughout the city. The efforts of developers such as Kristopher Kendrick and David Dewhirst, who have purchased and restored numerous dilapidated buildings, gradually helped lure residents back to the Downtown area. In the 2000s, Knoxville's planners turned their focus to the development of mixed residential and commercial neighborhoods (such as the Old City), cohesive, multipurpose shopping centers (such as Turkey Creek in West Knoxville), and a Downtown area with a mixture of unique retailers, restaurants, and cultural and entertainment venues, all with considerable success. In 2020, March 23, Knoxville businesses were shut down due to the COVID-19 pandemic.

== Historiography of Knoxville ==
The East Tennessee Historical Society's annual journal, published since 1929, contains numerous articles on Knoxville and Knoxville-area topics. The Society has also published two comprehensive histories of Knoxville and Knox County, The French Broad-Holston Country (1946), edited by Mary Utopia Rothrock, and Heart of the Valley (1976), edited by Lucile Deaderick. In 1982, the Society published a follow-up to Heart of the Valley, William MacArthur's Knoxville: Crossroads of the New South, which includes hundreds of historic photographs. Other comprehensive histories of the city include William Rule's Standard History of Knoxville (1900) and Ed Hooper's Knoxville (2003), the latter being part of Arcadia's "Images of America" series.

The Civil War is one of the most extensively covered periods of Knoxville's history. Two early first-hand accounts of the war in Knoxville are William G. Brownlow's Sketches of the Rise, Progress and Decline of Secession (1862) and the diary of Ellen Renshaw House, edited by Daniel Sutherland and published as A Very Violent Rebel: The Civil War Diary of Ellen Renshaw House (1996). First-hand accounts written after the war include William Rule's The Loyalists of Tennessee in the Late War (1887), Thomas Williams Humes's The Loyal Mountaineers of Tennessee (1888), Oliver Perry Temple's East Tennessee and the Civil War (1899), and Albert Chavannes's East Tennessee Sketches (1900). Modern works include Digby Gordon Seymour's Divided Loyalties: Fort Sanders and the Civil War (1963) and Robert McKenzie's Lincolnites and Rebels (2006).

Knoxville's history from the end of the Civil War to the modern period is covered in Knoxville, Tennessee: Continuity and Change in an Appalachian City (1983), written by Michael McDonald and Bruce Wheeler, and subsequently expanded by Wheeler as Knoxville, Tennessee: A Mountain City in the New South (2005). Mark Banker's Appalachians All (2010) discusses the development of three East Tennessee communities, Knoxville, Cades Cove, and the Clearfork Valley (in Campbell and Claiborne counties).

The history of Knoxville's African American community is covered in Robert Booker's Two Hundred Years of Black Culture in Knoxville, Tennessee: 1791 to 1991 (1994). Booker's The Heat of a Red Summer: Race Mixing, Race Rioting in 1919 Knoxville (2001) details the Riot of 1919. Merrill Proudfoot's Diary of a Sit-In (1962) provides an account of the 1960 Knoxville sit-ins. A significant portion of Charles Cansler's Three Generations: The Story of a Colored Family in Eastern Tennessee (1939) takes place in Knoxville. Native Knoxvillian James Herman Robinson describes his childhood in Knoxville in his autobiography, Road Without Turning (1950).

Since the early 1990s, Metro Pulse editor Jack Neely has written numerous articles (often for his column, "The Secret History") that recall some of the more colorful, odd, obscure, and forgotten aspects of the city's history. Neely's articles have been compiled into several books, including, The Secret History of Knoxville (1995), From the Shadow Side (2003), and Knoxville: This Obscure Prismatic City (2009). Arcadia has published several short books on local topics as part of its "Images of America" series, including Ed Hooper's WIVK (2008) and WNOX (2009), and 1982 World's Fair (2009) by Martha Rose Woodward. Other books on Knoxville topics include Wendy Lowe Besmann's Separate Circle: Jewish Life in Knoxville, Tennessee, which details the development of the city's Jewish community, and Sylvia Lynch's Harvey Logan in Knoxville (1998), which covers Kid Curry's time in the city. Knoxville native and college professor Dr. Marcy Conway has also written about Knoxville's history in the book The Sunsphere City (2022) coining this nickname for Knoxville as well as mentioning current arts and culture experiences in the area.

The Junior League of Knoxville's Knoxville: 50 Landmarks (1976), provides descriptions of various historical buildings in the city. A more detailed overview of the city's architectural development is provided in "Historic and Architectural Resources of Knox County" (1994), a pamphlet written by Metropolitan Planning Commission preservationist Ann Bennett for the National Register of Historic Places. The National Register includes over 100 buildings and districts in Knoxville and Knox County, with extensive descriptions of the buildings provided in their respective nomination forms, which are being digitized for the Register's online database.

== See also ==
- Timeline of Knoxville, Tennessee
- History of Tennessee
- List of people from Knoxville, Tennessee
- National Register of Historic Places listings in Knox County, Tennessee
- East Tennessee Historical Society
