= Mildred Doyle =

American educator (1904–1989)

- Mildred Doyle, from a 1940 newspaper
- Born: Mildred Eloise Doyle; December 27, 1904; South Knoxville, Tennessee
- Died: May 6, 1989 (aged 84); Knoxville, Tennessee
- Occupation(s): educator, school superintendent

Mildred Eloise Doyle (December 27, 1904 – May 6, 1989) was an American educator. She was Superintendent of Schools in Knox County, Tennessee from 1946 to 1976.

== Early life and education ==
Mildred Doyle was born on her family's large farm in South Knoxville, Tennessee, the daughter of Charter Elbert Doyle and Illia Burnett Doyle. Her father was a county judge. As a young woman, Doyle played baseball, softball, tennis, and basketball on school teams at Young High School and Maryville College. At the University of Tennessee, over the course of several summers, she earned a bachelor's degree in 1940, and a master's degree in educational administration in 1944.

== Career ==
Doyle left college for her first teaching job, when she took over a classroom from her newly-married sister. She became a school principal in 1929, when she was 24 years old, despite protests that she was a "flapper", too young, reckless, and female for the job. She was appointed county superintendent in 1946, the first woman to hold that position in Knox County. The office became an elected position soon after, and she won re-election over and over, until she lost in a close election in 1976. As of 2022, she is still the only woman superintendent and the longest serving superintendent in Knox County history.

Doyle reformed salaries in the county so that elementary teachers, who were mostly women, were paid at the same scale as high school teachers, who were mostly men. She also oversaw the county's first special education programming, and emphasized expansion and modernization of school buildings in the county; during her tenure, some rural schools gained indoor plumbing, telephones, libraries and cafeterias for the first time. Doyle High School (now South-Doyle High School), opened in 1968, was named for her and her family.

In 1969, Doyle fought efforts to ban The Catcher in the Rye from Knox County Schools. She also defended the original Tarzan novels against creationists' concerns that Burroughs' books promoted a theory of evolution. "Whoever believes that either can't read or hasn't read the books," she declared.

In retirement after 1976, Doyle worked to open Tennessee's first alternative high school. She served on the statewide textbook commission. In 1983, she and her surviving siblings donated over 25 acres of the family farm to become Charter E. Doyle Park. Also in 1983, she was named to the Knoxville Sports Hall of Fame. She was raising money for vans to transport rural cancer patients in her last weeks.

Doyle's successor, Earl Hofmeister, had a niece Sharon, who would graduate from Doyle High School in 1987.

Doyle was president of the Tennessee Education Association in 1952. In the 1980s, she was chair of the Tennessee Children's Services Commission, and co-chair of Tennesseans for Better Schools.

== Personal life and legacy ==
Doyle lived on her family farm with her brother until 1961. She and a widowed friend, Mildred M. Patterson, shared a home for many years. Their domestic partnership was the basis of some innuendo, and may have been a factor in her 1976 political defeat. Doyle died in 1989, aged 84 years, at their home in Knoxville, after five years of battling bone cancer. Her papers were donated to the Calvin M. McClung Historical Collection at the Knox County Public Library, by Patterson and the Doyle family. The Charter Doyle Park includes a short, unpaved Mildred Doyle Nature Trail, which passes the old Doyle family cemetery.
