= Happy Holler Historic District =

Historic district in Tennessee, United States

- U.S. Historic district
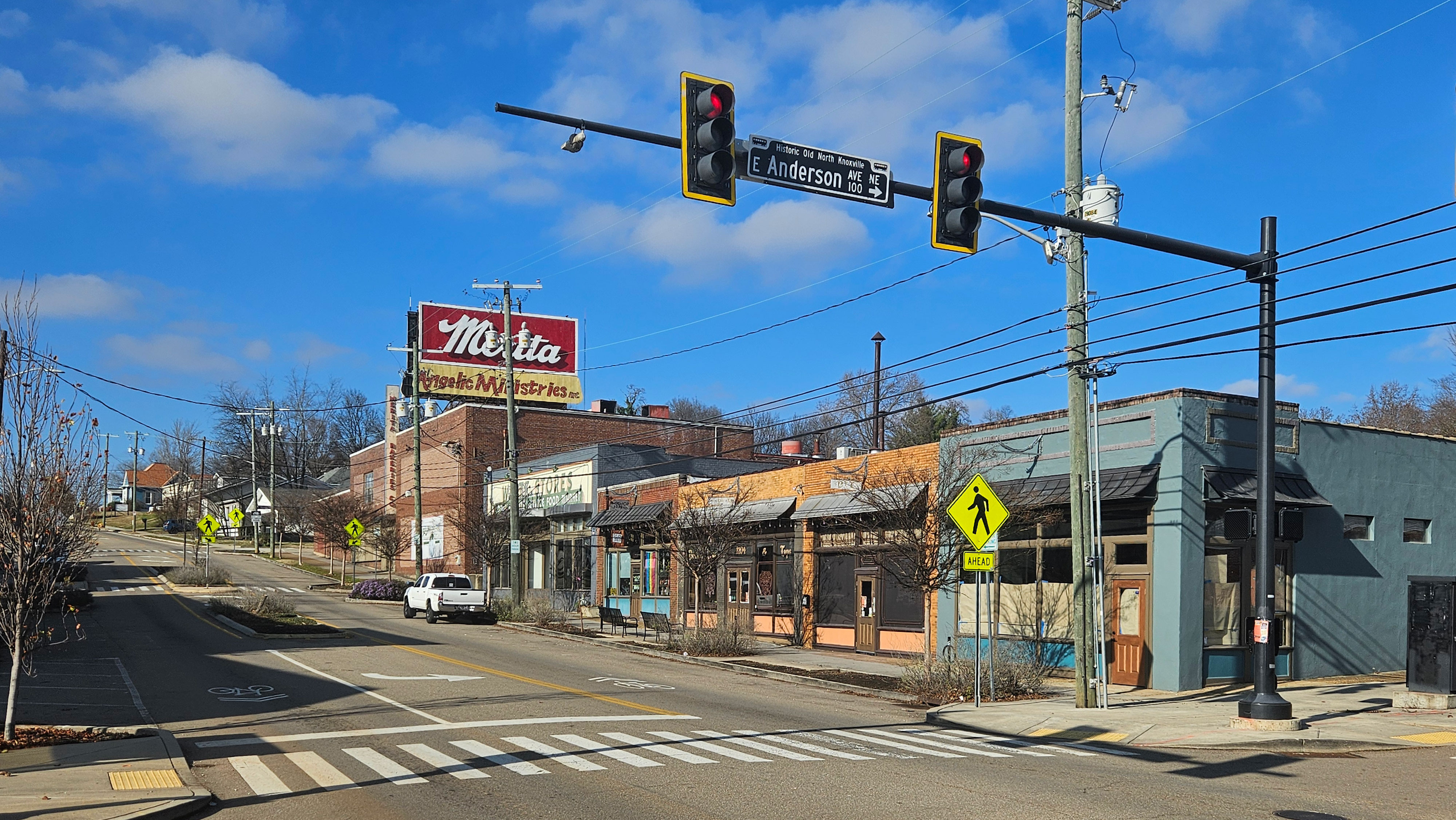
- Happy Holler Historic District in 2025
- Location: Knoxville, Tennessee
- Architect: multiple
- Added to NRHP: August 13, 2014

The Happy Holler Historic District is a historic district in Knoxville, Tennessee, United States, listed on the National Register of Historic Places in 2014.

== Location ==
Situated around North Central Street and East and West Anderson Avenues, the district runs along both sides of the 1200 block of North Central Street in the community now known as Old North Knoxville.

== History ==
The district is one of seven remaining community-based shopping areas developed around Knoxville’s former trolley routes, in this case near the Oklahoma Avenue station.

Most buildings are one-story masonry commercial structures built between 1909 and 1945. The area served residents of what is now Old North Knoxville—a Victorian-era neighborhood east of Happy Holler—as well as families of textile, railroad, and iron workers who lived to the west around the Brookside Mills. Trolley lines also brought other Knoxvillians, including many from the nearby Lincoln Park and Oakwood subdivisions, to the district’s grocery stores, drugstores, movie theater, and other venues.

The name «Happy Holler» dates to the Prohibition era, when alcohol could be purchased in the alleys behind the stores. The first suburban movie theater in Knoxville, The Picto, opened at 1205 Central Street in 1926; since 2018, the building has operated as Central Cinema.

Until the closure of nearby Brookside Mills in 1969, the district functioned as a small, thriving neighborhood commercial area. Activity increased again in the mid-2000s, due in part to Façade Improvement Grants provided through the U.S. Department of Housing and Urban Development.

In August 2014, the district was added to the National Register of Historic Places by the Tennessee Historical Commission, alongside the Norris Dam State Park Rustic Cabins Historic District in Anderson County, the C.C. Card Auto Company Building in Cleveland, and the Miller Farmstead in Carter County.
