= Brookside Mills =

19th-century textile manufacturing company in Knoxville, Tennessee

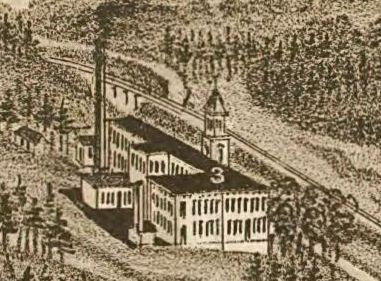
Brookside Mills, as it appeared on an 1886 map of Knoxville

Brookside Mills was a textile manufacturing company that operated in Knoxville, Tennessee, United States, in the late 19th and early 20th centuries. The company's Second Creek factory was the city's largest employer in the early 1900s. Brookside Village, a neighborhood in North Knoxville, was originally developed to house many of the factory's workers. The company closed in 1956.

== History ==
After the Civil War, Knoxville grew to become the third largest wholesaling center in the southeastern United States. In the 1870s and 1880s, wholesale company owners began reinvesting their profits in other industries, helping to build the city's first large-scale textile factories. Knoxville Woolen Mills, the city's first major textile manufacturer, was founded in 1884.

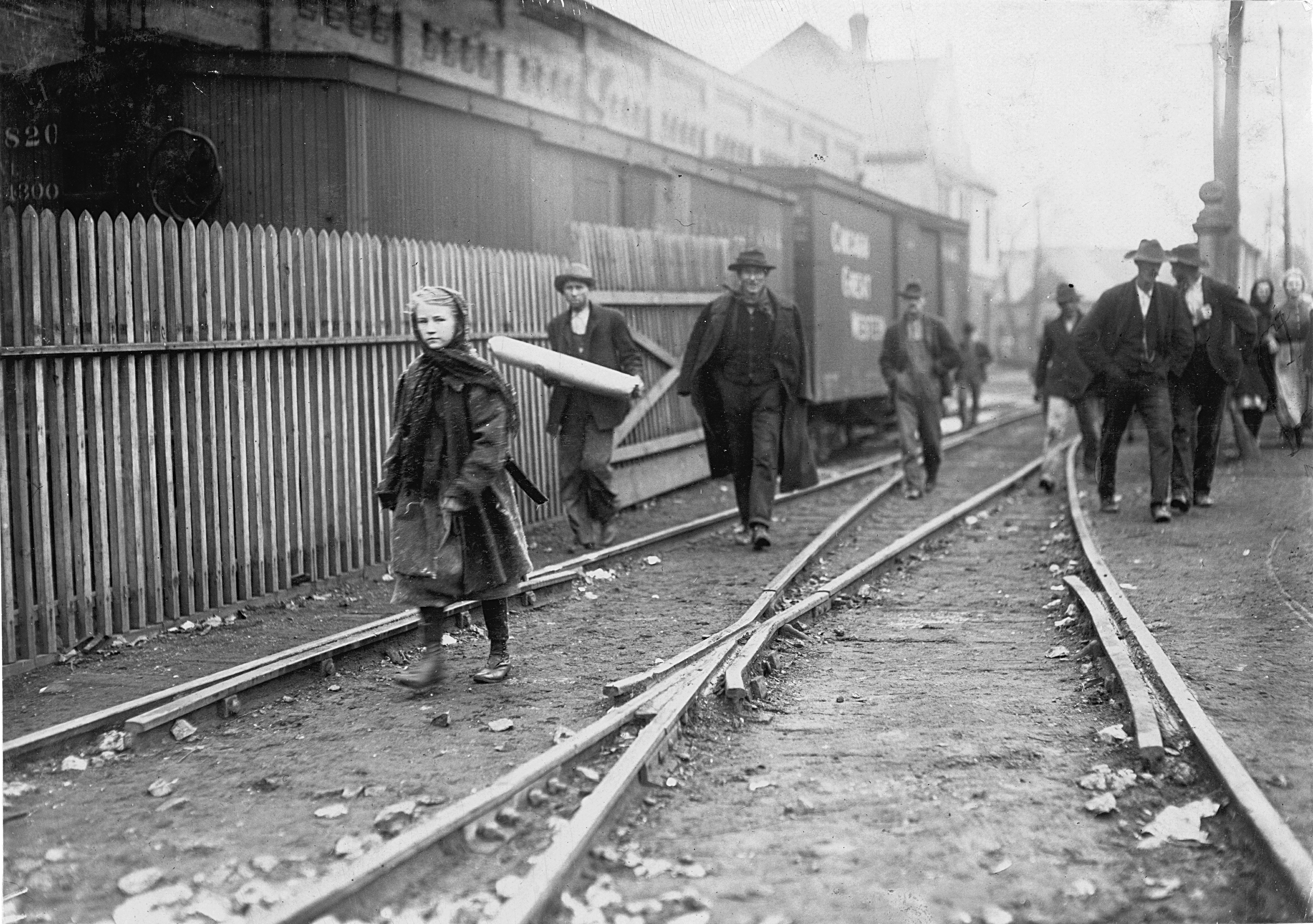
1910 photograph of Brookside workers, some children, taken by Lewis Wickes Hine

Brookside Mills was organized in November 1885, with $150,000 in initial capital. The following year, the company erected its two-story factory along Second Creek, on what was then the city's northwest periphery. The factory was initially 78 feet (24 m) by 210 feet (64 m), and contained 6,000 spindles and 176 looms. W. R. Tuttle, who had helped establish the Knoxville Iron Company in the late 1860s, was chosen as Brookside's first president.

In 1895, Brookside raised its operating capital to $500,000, and overhauled its Second Creek mill. The factory was extended from 210 feet to 350 feet (110 m), and a new weaving building was built adjacent to the main factory. The number of spindles was increased to 21,000, and the number of looms was increased to 650, quadrupling the mill's output from 3 million yards of fabric per year to 12 million. After Tuttle left in 1898, James Maynard, son of former congressman Horace Maynard, was named president.

By the early 1900s, the textile industry had become Knoxville's largest employer served by the since-defunct trolley route along North Central Ave with the Oklahoma Ave station, which contributed to the emergence of the Happy Holler Historic District. While Knoxville Woolen Mills had the larger factory, Brookside's 1,200 employees represented the city's largest workforce. The father of movie director Clarence Brown was general manager of the Brookside Mills in the first decade of the 20th century. Photographer Lewis Hine visited Brookside Mills in 1910 as part of his assignment as an investigative photographer documenting the working conditions of child workers for the National Child Labor Committee. Several of his photographs of Brookside's youthful workers survive.

After World War II increasing foreign competition and the high costs of modernization doomed the city's textile factories. After Cherokee Mills and Venus Hosiery closed in 1954, the city offered Brookside $350,000 in tax incentives to keep its factory open. The company cut salaries and gradually reduced its workforce before finally shutting down in 1956.

Weaving operations continued in some form at the Brookside factory until 1969. In 1996 the buildings were demolished. The site remained vacant until recent years when Holston Gases built a facility on the site.

In October 2011, Holston Gases announced their intention to move their Knoxville gas facility to the former Brookside Mills site. The $10 million project was forecasted to produce between 20 and 30 new jobs. This business is now in operation.
