= John M. Fleming =

American newspaper editor, attorney and politician

Member of the Tennessee House of Representatives from Knox County
- In office October 7, 1861 – February 1862
- Preceded by: John Williams
- Succeeded by: William Heiskell
- In office October 4, 1869 – September 30, 1871
- Preceded by: L.M. Mynatt
- Succeeded by: Charles McClung McGhee

Personal details
- Born: December 12, 1832 Rogersville, Tennessee, U.S.
- Died: October 28, 1900 (aged 67) Knoxville, Tennessee, U.S.
- Resting place: Old Gray Cemetery; Knoxville, Tennessee
- Party: Whig; Know Nothing; Unionist; Democratic
- Spouse: Anna Howard Boyd
- Children: 2
- Education: Emory and Henry College
- Occupation: Attorney, newspaper editor

John Miller Fleming (December 12, 1832 – October 28, 1900) was an American newspaper editor, attorney and politician, active primarily in Tennessee during the latter half of the 19th century. He rose to prominence as editor of the Knoxville Register in the late 1850s, and worked as the editor of various newspapers, including the Knoxville Press and Herald, the Knoxville Tribune (which he cofounded), and the Knoxville Sentinel, in the decades following the Civil War. He also served two terms in the Tennessee House of Representatives, and was appointed Tennessee's first Superintendent of Public Instruction in 1873.

Fleming campaigned against secession on the eve of the Civil War, and served as secretary of the pro-Union East Tennessee Convention in 1861. After the war, he opposed the policies of Governor William G. Brownlow and the Radical Republicans.

== Early life ==
Fleming was born in Rogersville, Tennessee, the son of David Fleming, a Methodist minister, and Mary (Miller) Fleming. He studied at Emory and Henry College, graduating in 1851 after winning the school's Robertson prize medal for oratory. During the early 1850s, he taught at the Rittenhouse Academy in Kingston, Tennessee.

In May 1855, Fleming was hired as editor of the Knoxville Register, a newspaper that had been published in Knoxville since 1816. Like many Tennessee Whigs, Fleming threw his support behind the nativist Know Nothing movement after the collapse of the national Whig Party in the mid-1850s. Arguing that "Americans should rule America," Fleming used the columns of the Register to support the presidential candidacy of Millard Fillmore and the gubernatorial candidacy of Meredith Poindexter Gentry, and criticized Governor Andrew Johnson and other Democrats. One newspaper described Fleming's Register as the most "violent know-nothing Fillmore journal in the State."

In 1857, Fleming quarreled with Irish Patriot John Mitchel, who spent time in Knoxville while in exile and befriended the city's Democrats. In October of that year, Mitchel confronted Fleming in front of the Lamar House Hotel over a Register column that had ridiculed him. After words were exchanged, Mitchel struck Fleming with a cane, and a minor brawl ensued before police intervened and dispersed the crowd that had gathered. After an hour or so had passed, Fleming returned to the street and demanded Mitchel's presence, though accounts differ as to what happened next. According to Fleming, he challenged Mitchel to a duel, but Mitchel refused. Mitchel, however, denied that Fleming made any such challenge. He stated Fleming appeared to be at a loss for words in this second encounter, so he merely dismissed Fleming as a "whipped man" and left the scene.

In June 1858, Fleming resigned from the Register due to a disagreement with the paper's publisher. He turned to the study of law under the guidance of prominent Knoxville attorney John Baxter. He was admitted to the bar in late 1858, and became a partner in Baxter's law firm.

Fleming remained politically connected throughout the late 1850s and early 1860s. He served as secretary of the state's American Party (Know Nothing) convention in May 1857, and was a member of the Opposition Party's state executive committee in 1859. In 1860, he was a delegate to the Constitutional Union Party's national convention in Baltimore, where he supported the party's eventual presidential nominee, John Bell.

== Civil War and postwar politics ==
Described by historian Oliver Perry Temple as "the youngest of the Union leaders of East Tennessee," Fleming played an important role in energizing the region's Unionists during the early days of the secession crisis. At a countywide meeting in Knoxville in late November 1860, Fleming, who along with Temple and Samuel R. Rodgers was among the few Unionists in attendance, thwarted a vote on a series of pro-secession resolutions by initiating a complicated parliamentary maneuver that confused the convention chairman and forced the meeting to adjourn. The extra time allowed people from the rural parts of the county— where there was greater support for the Union— to travel to Knoxville. When the meeting reconvened in early December, Unionists outnumbered secessionists, and a series of resolutions introduced by Fleming declaring secession unconstitutional were adopted.

At the first session of the pro-Union East Tennessee Convention in May 1861, Fleming was appointed secretary. He served in the same capacity at the Convention's second session in Greeneville after Tennessee had seceded in June. He opposed a series of hostile resolutions introduced by the Convention's president, T.A.R. Nelson, and instead supported a less provocative set of resolutions introduced by Temple which essentially asked the state legislature to let East Tennessee break away and join the Union. Fleming was among the delegates appointed to a secret committee tasked with carrying the business of the Convention during adjournment. Years later, when Temple wrote about the Convention in his book, East Tennessee and the Civil War, he used Fleming's minutes as a primary source.

In August 1861, Fleming was elected to Knox County's seat in the Tennessee House of Representatives. The state having joined the Confederate States of America, Fleming took the oath of allegiance to the Confederacy, though East Tennessee's Unionists still considered him a Union supporter. In December 1861, Fleming was arrested by Confederate authorities for harboring a Union fugitive, fellow state legislator Robert H. Hodsden, and held for several days. Judge West Hughes Humphreys acquitted both Hodsden and Fleming, however, and Fleming returned to the legislature. When the Union Army captured Nashville in February 1862, Fleming fled with the state government to Memphis. By early 1863, however, he had fled to Union territory in Kentucky. During this period, he wrote a humorous article mocking the state government's hasty flight from Nashville, which was published in various newspapers. In August 1863, he delivered a petition to President Abraham Lincoln demanding he order the Union Army to invade and liberate East Tennessee.

After the Union Army recaptured Knoxville in late 1863, Fleming returned to the city. He was appointed secretary of the East Tennessee Relief Association, which had been organized to provide aid to the region's Unionists. He was offered an appointment as U.S. Attorney for the Eastern District of Tennessee by Lincoln, but turned it down. He supported Democratic presidential nominee George B. McClellan during the presidential election of 1864, and subsequently became a lifelong Democrat.

After the war, Fleming joined the Conservative faction in opposition to the Radical Republicans and the policies of Governor William Gannaway Brownlow. In June 1867, he launched the Knoxville Free Press to support Conservative positions. In December of the same year, the Free Press merged with William J. Ramage's Knoxville Herald to form the Knoxville Press and Herald. Fleming worked as the new paper's editor, and Ramage served as its publisher.

In his editorials, Fleming described the Conservative faction as an all-embracing movement, consisting of "Confederates and Unionists, Democrats and Whigs." He criticized Brownlow's franchise law, which denied former Confederates the right to vote, as unconstitutional, and argued that Brownlow preferred to "deluge Tennessee with blood rather than suffer a peaceful defeat at the ballot-box." In late 1868, he came to the defense of newly elected Speaker of the Tennessee Senate Dewitt Clinton Senter, who had been charged by state senator Alfred Cate with serving in the Confederate government (which would have made him ineligible for public office at the time). In October 1868, Fleming, who faced frequent threats from Radicals, was ambushed outside a Knoxville grocery store and knocked "partially senseless" from a blow to the head.

In August 1869, Fleming was again elected to Knox County's seat in the Tennessee House of Representatives, part of the Conservative wave that swept the Radicals out of power. He was nominated for Speaker of the House, but was defeated, 53 votes to 25, by William Perkins. He served as chairman of the House Judiciary Committee. He did not seek reelection to a second term.

== Later career ==
Fleming campaigned as an elector for Democratic candidate Horace Greeley in the 1872 presidential race. During the same period, he campaigned for the Democratic gubernatorial candidate, John C. Brown. He was occasionally considered a candidate for the Democratic nomination for governor, but never received it due to what Temple described as "certain irregularities in his personal habits."

In 1873, Governor Brown appointed Fleming Superintendent of Public Instruction, which oversaw the state's public school system. The position had been created earlier that year as part of a reorganization effort that aimed to provide greater access to the state's public schools. He was removed from office in 1875 by newly elected Governor James D. Porter, who wanted to give the position to a West Tennessean to provide a more balanced geographic representation in the state government.

In February 1876, Fleming cofounded the Knoxville Tribune, a Democratic newspaper, in partnership with Samuel McKinney. He and McKinney then purchased the Knoxville Press and Herald from Ramage and shut down its publication, essentially transferring its readership to the Tribune. He continued editing the Tribune until late 1878, when he resigned and formed a law partnership with H.H. Ingersoll.

In 1880, Fleming served as an elector for Democratic presidential candidate Winfield S. Hancock. During the 1880s, he worked as an editor for various newspapers, including the Knoxville Sentinel, one of the predecessors of the Knoxville News Sentinel. In April 1890, Fleming became embroiled in a quarrel with Congressman James Phelan, Jr., after blasting Phelan's book, School History of Tennessee, for its comments on the early settlers of East Tennessee. Calling Fleming a "liar, coward and scoundrel," Phelan challenged him to a duel. Fleming declined the challenge in a sarcasm-laced response.

In November 1890, Fleming attempted suicide while staying at the Lamar House in Knoxville. He survived, but his mental state continued to decline in his later years. He died in Knoxville on October 28, 1900, and was interred in Old Gray Cemetery.
