= Heiskell =

Heiskell is a surname. Notable people with the surname include:

- Andrew Heiskell (1915–2003), American journalist and philanthropist
- Frederick Heiskell (1786–1882), American newspaper publisher, politician, and civic leader
- Hike Heiskell (1940–2016), American politician and lawyer
- John N. Heiskell (1872–1972), American politician
- Joseph Brown Heiskell (1823–1913), American politician
- William Heiskell (1788–1871), American politician
