= Senator Heiskell (disambiguation) =

John N. Heiskell (1872–1972) was a U.S. Senator from Arkansas in 1913. Senator Heiskell may also refer to:

- Frederick Heiskell (1786–1882), Tennessee State Senate
- Joseph Brown Heiskell (1823–1913), Tennessee State Senate

== See also ==
- Senator Haskell (disambiguation)
