= 1859 Tennessee gubernatorial election =

- August 4, 1859
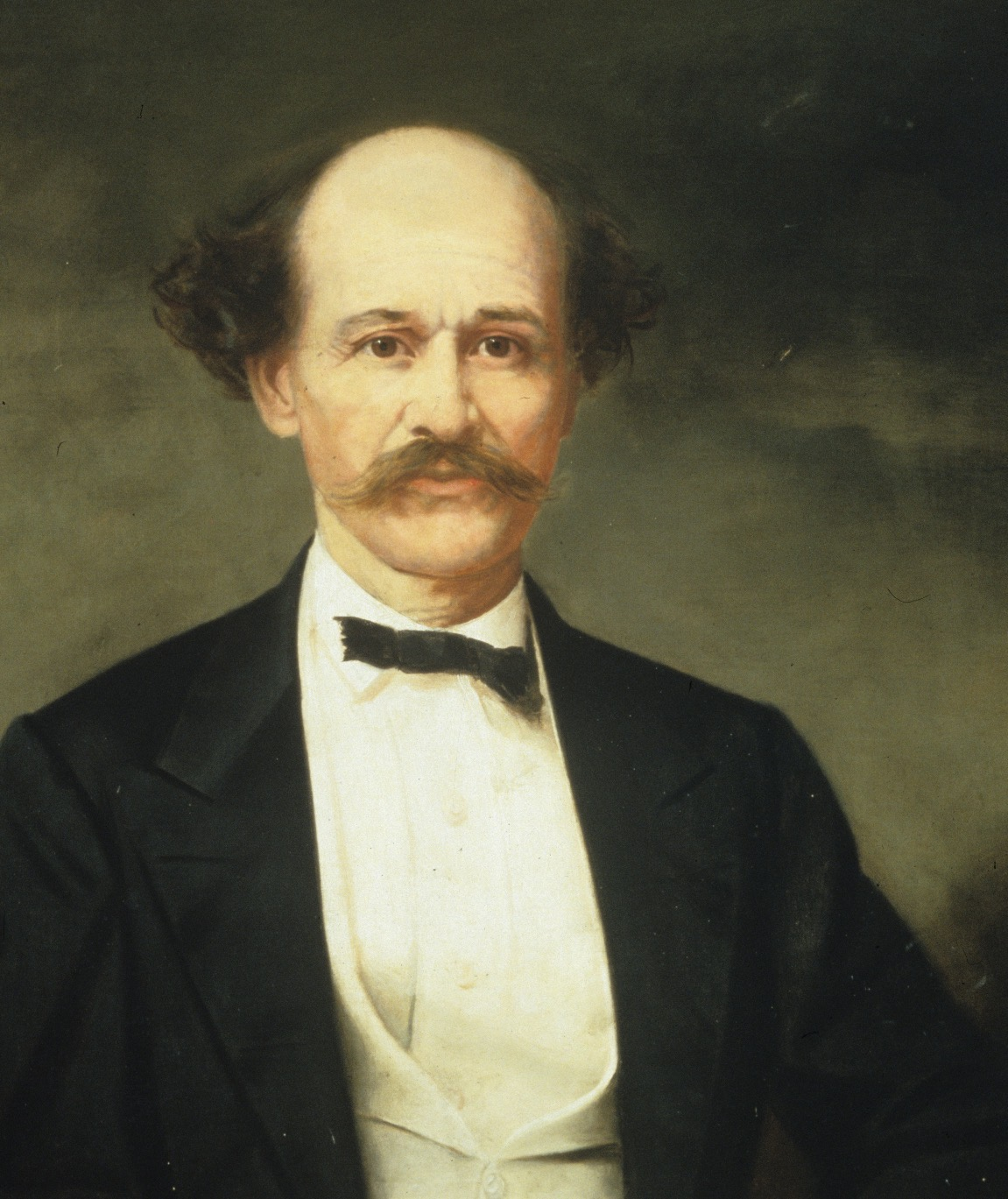

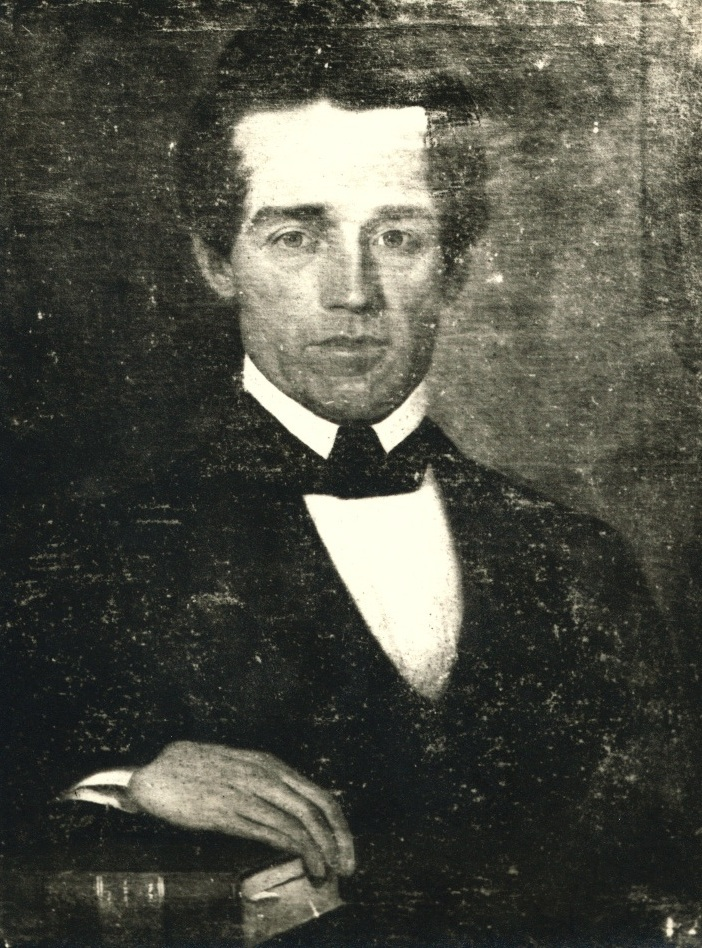
Nominee	Isham G. Harris	John Netherland
Party	Democratic	Opposition
Popular vote	76,073	68,042
Percentage	52.79%	47.21%
- County results Harris: 50–60% 60–70% 70–80% 70–80% 80–90% >90% Netherland: 50–60% 60–70% 70–80% No data/No votes
Governor before election
Isham G. Harris
Democratic
Elected Governor
Isham G. Harris
Democratic

The 1859 Tennessee gubernatorial election was held on August 4, 1859, to elect the governor of Tennessee. Incumbent Democratic governor Isham G. Harris narrowly won re-election, defeating Opposition Party John Netherland with 52.79% of the vote.

== Campaign ==
Isham Harris ran for re-election against John Netherland, who had been nominated by a hodge-podge group of ex-Whigs, ex-Know Nothings, and disgruntled Democrats, known as the Opposition Party. Harris campaigned on fears of northern abolitionists, while Netherland argued that the U.S. Constitution provided the best protection for Southern rights, and thus, it was in the state's interest to remain in the Union.

== General election ==
1859 Tennessee gubernatorial election
Party	Candidate	Votes	%	±%
Democratic	Isham G. Harris (incumbent)	76,073	52.79	
Opposition	John Netherland	68,042	47.21	
Total votes		144,115	100.00	
