= Eugenia Dunlap Potts =

American writer

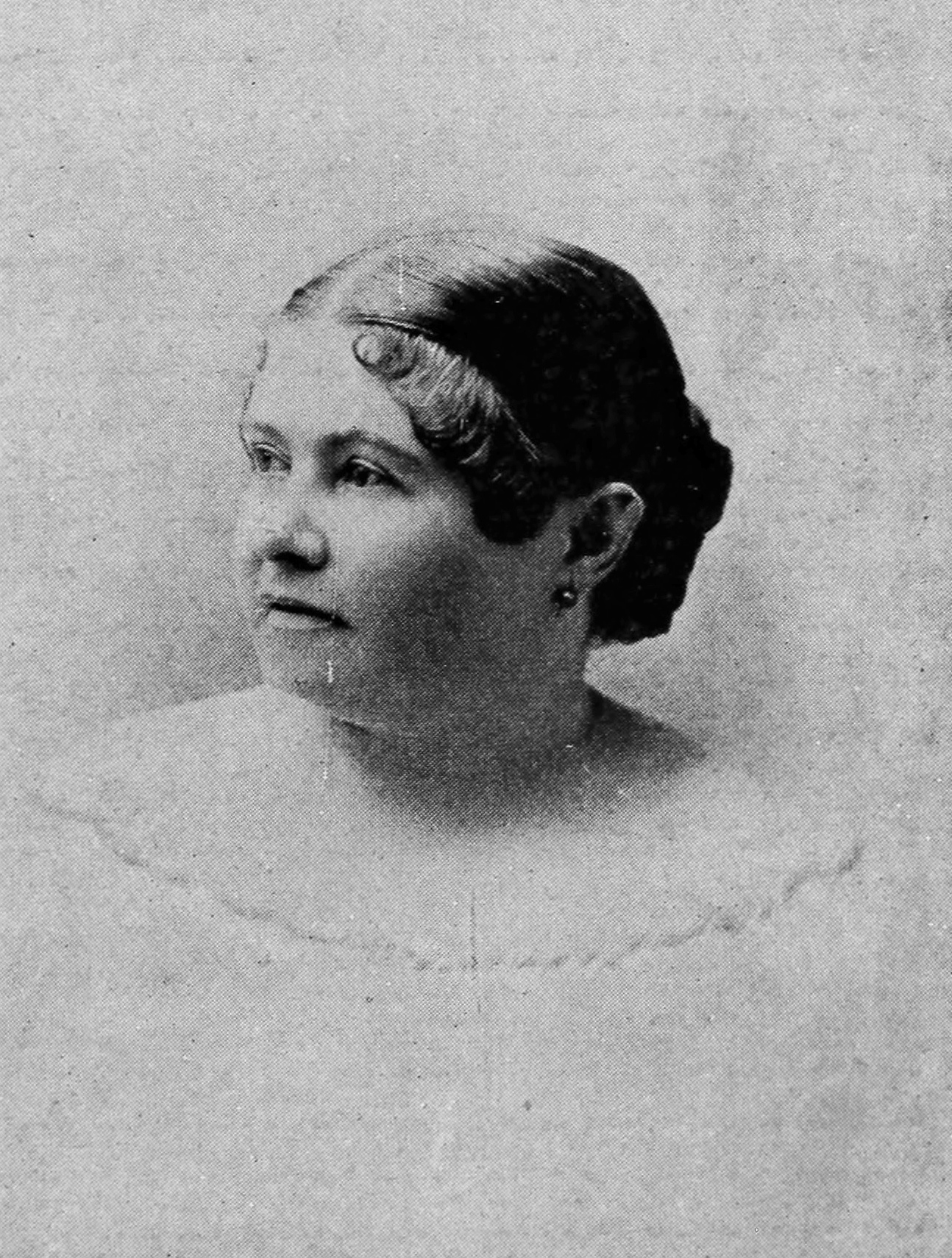
- Eugenia Dunlap Potts in the late 19th-century.
- Born: 14 April 1840; Lancaster, Kentucky, U.S.
- Died: February 29, 1912 (aged 71); Fayette County, Kentucky, U.S.
- Resting place: Lancaster Cemetery, Lancaster, Kentucky
- Occupation: Poet
- Spouse: Richard Potts
- Children: George Dunlap Potts
- Parent(s): George W. Dunlap; Nancy (Nannie) E. Jennings
- Writing career
- Language: English
- Genre: Poetry

Eugenia Dunlap Potts (April 14, 1840 - February 29, 1912) was a writer in Lancaster, Kentucky. She owned and edited the Illustrated Kentuckian. She wrote poetry and historical works. Potts was recognized by the State of Kentucky for her contributions as a Kentucky author with a plaque outside the site of her former home.

== Early life and education ==
Potts was born in Lancaster, Kentucky, the daughter of lawyer and statesman George W. Dunlap and Nancy (Nannie) E. Jennings. She graduated from the Franklin Female Institute in Lancaster. She also attended a finishing school in Philadelphia, where she studied music and French.

== Career ==
Her "Song of Lancaster" was described as a "metrical history after the style of Hiawatha". Longfellow corresponded with her approvingly about it. She also wrote the essay "Women's Work in Kentucky".

In May 1892, Potts joined a new monthly publication focused on "literature, education and art", called the Illustrated Kentuckian. The paper was managed by a journalist from New York, Ben La Bree; Potts joined the editorial staff, and was responsible for the "belles lettres and social features". The paper was eventually.relocated to Louisville and became the Illustrated South.

In the early twentieth century, she worked for women's suffrage in Kentucky.

== Personal life ==
Potts was a member of the United Daughters of the Confederacy. She served as a state officer for its Kentucky branch, and as a delegate from its Lexington chapter to the seventh annual convention of the organisation in 1900. She was a member of the Episcopal Church.

She married Major Richard Potts, a surgeon who served in first the U.S. Army and then in the Confederate Army. They had one son, named George Dunlap Potts, who was born in Montgomery, Alabama, in 1865. She became a widow.

== Bibliography ==
- Historic Papers on the Causes of the Civil War
- Song of Lancaster, Kentucky; To the statesmen, soldiers, and citizens of Garrard county (1874)
- Idle hour stories / Stories for Children (1909)
- The old South (1909)
- A collection of four papers, The old South, Slavery, Secession, The Southern Confederacy
- A Kentucky girl in Dixie: a diary
- Journal of the daily life, travels and war-time experiences of the author, wife of a surgeon in the Confederate army
- Historic homes of Lancaster, Kentucky
