= Opposition Party =

Opposition Party may refer to:

- Opposition Party (Northern U.S.)
- Opposition Party (Southern U.S.)
- Parliamentary opposition
- Opposition (politics)
