= George W. Dunlap =

American politician

George Dunlap
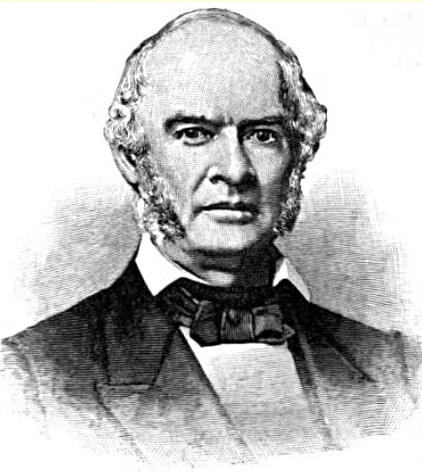

Member of the U.S. House of Representatives from Kentucky's 6th district
- In office March 4, 1861 – March 3, 1863
- Preceded by: Green Adams
- Succeeded by: Green C. Smith

Member of the Kentucky House of Representatives from Garrard County
- In office August 1, 1853 – August 6, 1855
- Preceded by: George R. McKee
- Succeeded by: Joshua Dunn

Personal details
- Born: George Washington Dunlap; February 22, 1813 Lexington, Kentucky, U.S.
- Died: June 16, 1890 (aged 77) Lancaster, Kentucky, U.S.
- Resting place: Lancaster Cemetery
- Education: Transylvania University

George Washington Dunlap (February 22, 1813 – June 6, 1880) was a U.S. representative from Kentucky.

Born at Walnut Hills, near Lexington, Kentucky, Dunlap pursued preparatory studies. He was graduated from Transylvania University, Lexington, Kentucky, in 1834. He studied law. He was admitted to the bar and commenced practice in Lancaster, Kentucky.

He served as commissioner of the circuit court 1843–1874. He served as member of the Kentucky House of Representatives in 1853.

Dunlap was elected as a Unionist to the Thirty-seventh Congress (March 4, 1861 – March 3, 1863). He served as chairman of the Committee on Expenditures in the Department of the Navy (Thirty-seventh Congress).

He served as member of the Border State Convention in 1861. He was one of the managers appointed by the House of Representatives in 1862 to conduct the impeachment proceedings against West H. Humphreys, United States judge for the several districts of Tennessee.

He resumed the practice of law.

Eugenia Dunlap Potts, who became a historian, was his daughter. He died in Lancaster, Kentucky, on June 6, 1880. He was interred in Lancaster Cemetery.

U.S. House of Representatives
Preceded by Green Adams	Member of the U.S. House of Representatives from Kentucky's 6th congressional district 1861 – 1863	Succeeded by Green C. Smith
