= Frederick Heiskell =

American politician and newspaper publisher (1786–1882)

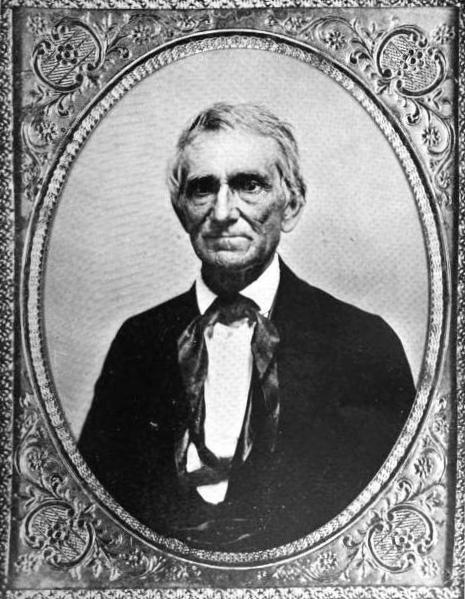
- Pioneer of Tennessee Journalism

Member of the Tennessee Senate from Knox County
- In office October 4, 1847 – October 1, 1849
- Preceded by: Thomas C. McCampbell
- Succeeded by: John F. Henry

Mayor of Knoxville, Tennessee
- In office 1835
- Preceded by: Solomon D. Jacobs
- Succeeded by: William C. Mynatt

Personal details
- Born: 1786 Hagerstown, Maryland, United States
- Died: November 29, 1882 (aged 95–96) Rogersville, Tennessee
- Party: Whig; Know Nothing; Democratic
- Spouse(s): Eliza Brown (1816–1851, her death); Alice Armstrong Fulkerson (1853–1874, her death)
- Relations: William Heiskell (brother); Joseph Brown Heiskell (son); John Netherland Heiskell (grandson)
- Occupation: Farmer, publisher

Frederick Steidinger Heiskell (1786 – November 29, 1882) was an American newspaper publisher, politician, and civic leader, active primarily in Knoxville, Tennessee, throughout much of the 19th century. He cofounded the Knoxville Register, which during its early years was the city's only newspaper, and operated a printing firm that published a number of early important books on Tennessee history and law. He also served one term in the Tennessee Senate (1847–1849), and briefly served as Mayor of Knoxville in 1835. He was a trustee, organizer, or financial supporter of numerous schools and civic organizations.

A Southern Unionist, Heiskell was a delegate to the pro-Union East Tennessee Convention on the eve of the Civil War. After the war, he opposed the radical policies of Governor William G. Brownlow.

== Early life and career ==
Heiskell was born in Hagerstown, Maryland, the son of Frederic Heiskell, a farmer, and Catherine (Steidinger) Heiskell. While still young, his family moved to Shenandoah County, Virginia, where he attended subscription schools. He began working in the printing shop of his brother, John, in Winchester, Virginia, in 1810. In 1814, he moved to Knoxville, where he worked as a printer for the Knoxville Gazette, a newspaper that had been founded in the early 1790s by George Roulstone, but was then being published by Roulstone's old business partner, George Wilson.

Heiskell married Eliza Brown, a sister of Knoxville Latin teacher Hugh Brown, on July 17, 1816, in Jonesborough, Tennessee. On August 3 of that year, he and Hugh Brown launched the Knoxville Register. Heiskell was responsible for the paper's political commentary, while Brown focused on its literary content. After Brown retired in 1829, Heiskell continued alone until 1837, when he sold the paper to W.B.A. Ramsey and Robert Craighead. The Register supported Senator John Williams in his feud with Andrew Jackson in 1823. While it endorsed Jackson in the 1824 and 1828 presidential races, it supported fellow Knoxvillian Hugh Lawson White of the burgeoning anti-Jackson Whig Party in the 1836 race.

Along with the Register, the printing shop of Heiskell and Brown published numerous books, pamphlets, and other works. These included Judge John Haywood's Civil and Political History of Tennessee (1823), one of the first comprehensive histories of the state, Judge Edward Scott's Laws of the State of Tennessee (1821), sermons by religious figures such as Isaac L. Anderson and John Doak, and the first major work of William "Parson" Brownlow, Helps to the Study of Presbyterianism (1834). Heiskell and Brown also published the Western Monitor and Religious Observer, a periodical which advocated emancipation, from 1818 to 1820.

Heiskell used the columns of the Register to support education and civic advancement in Knoxville. The paper led the drive to reopen East Tennessee College (the forerunner of the University of Tennessee) in 1820, and advocated the establishment of the Knoxville Female Academy in 1827. Heiskell helped finance this latter institution, which later became the East Tennessee Female Institute, and served both as a professor and as one of its trustees from its founding in 1827 until his death in 1882. Heiskell was a cofounder of the Knoxville Library Company (a subscription-based library), and served as the first president of the Knoxville Typographical Society.

Heiskell was first elected to Knoxville's Board of Aldermen in 1824, and served in this capacity through 1831. He returned to the Board in 1835, and briefly served as mayor that year. In 1847, he was elected to the Tennessee Senate seat for Knox County. His committee assignments included Education and Common Schools, Internal Improvement, Claims, and Banks. He was also appointed by Speaker Josiah M. Anderson to a three-man "engrossment" committee, which was tasked with finalizing bills before they were sent to the House.

During the 1850s, Heiskell focused on business and farming interests. He was appointed to the Board of Directors for the East Tennessee and Georgia Railroad in 1852, and was elected president of the Knox County Agricultural Society in 1856. He remained politically active, however, chairing an American Party ("Know Nothing") convention in Knoxville in October 1855.

== Civil War ==
As the secession crisis heated up following the election of Abraham Lincoln in November 1860, Heiskell wrote a letter to Constitutional Union candidate John Bell suggesting he call a convention of Southern states to discuss the crisis. Heiskell believed such a convention would isolate fanatical secessionists and allow moderates a greater voice, and give Southern states an opportunity to explain their grievances to the Northern states. While he was supported in this effort by fellow Knoxville Unionist John Baxter, other Knoxville Unionists, including Oliver Perry Temple and Samuel R. Rodgers, were convinced that secessionists would dominate such a convention, and advised against it.

Heiskell campaigned against secession throughout the first half of 1861. In May 1861, he attended the pro-Union East Tennessee Convention as a member of the Knox County delegation. While he abandoned open resistance to the Confederacy after the Confederate Army occupied the region in August 1861, he was nevertheless arrested in December for refusing to take the Confederate oath of allegiance, and charged with "inciting rebellion." He reportedly told his son, "I will rot in jail before I take that oath." He was released after ten days on the orders of General Felix K. Zollicoffer, the commander of Confederate forces in the region, who had once worked in Heiskell's printing office. In February 1862, Heiskell exchanged "angry words" with Colonel Danville Leadbetter when he was denied leave to visit Unionist leader William "Parson" Brownlow, who had been jailed in Knoxville.

Like many East Tennessee families, the Heiskells were divided during the Civil War. Frederick and his brother, William Heiskell, were ardent Unionists. Frederick's sons, Joseph Brown Heiskell and Carrick White Heiskell, along with three sons-in-law, supported the Confederacy. Joseph served in the Confederate Congress, and Carrick rose to the rank of colonel in the Confederate army. Carrick was married to Eliza Netherland, a daughter of prominent Unionist John Netherland.

== Postwar politics ==
Toward the end of the war, Heiskell's decades-old friendship with Brownlow began to sour. When the East Tennessee Convention reconvened in Knoxville in April 1864, Heiskell supported the convention's "conservative" faction, which opposed the Emancipation Proclamation and endorsed George B. McClellan for president. Brownlow, who had become a celebrity in the North, led the faction that supported the Proclamation and endorsed Lincoln for president. Heiskell accused Brownlow of selling "his books and his soul" to northern abolitionists, and stated his supporters would do whatever "dirty work their dirty master commanded them." After Joseph Brown Heiskell was captured by Union soldiers in August 1864, Brownlow's newspaper, the Whig, demanded he face the "most rigorous" military penalties.

In August 1865, Heiskell ran for the second district's open seat in Congress. He expressed support for President Andrew Johnson, and vowed to seek compensation for East Tennessee Unionists whose property had been taken or destroyed by the Union Army. He also opposed black suffrage, though he had accepted emancipation as an outcome of the war. He defended his endorsement of McClellan in 1864, stating that while he had "full faith and confidence in Mr. Lincoln's patriotism," he had preferred McClellan for his military experience. The Whig, which had endorsed Horace Maynard for the seat, suggested that Heiskell was supported by "all the rebels and copperheads of the second district." On election day, Heiskell garnered just 217 of the 12,785 votes cast in the election, placing fifth and far behind the winner, Maynard. Heiskell blamed the lopsided loss on voter intimidation, and accused Brownlow of meddling in the election.

The feud between Brownlow and Heiskell flared up again in April 1866, when the Whig accused Heiskell of calling Brownlow a "damned liar" at a rally in Knoxville. In a scathing editorial published in the Knoxville Commercial, Heiskell denied cursing, but stood by his accusation that Brownlow was a liar. He ripped Brownlow as a "parody of a Governor," the "incarnation of all villification," and the "embodiment of filthy abuse." He stated that Brownlow's typical editorials were nothing more than the "low, coarse, vulgar personal abuse of better men than himself." The Whig dismissed Heiskell's attack as "a bungling mass of vulgar epithets," and stated that Heiskell was merely angry over the financial losses he had suffered due to the emancipation of his slaves.

In May 1866, Heiskell published another editorial in which he accused Brownlow of exaggerating his "sufferings" at the hands of Confederate authorities in order to exploit northern sympathy and sell books. The Whig responded with an article mocking Heiskell as an "old Whisky-rotted, broken-down political hack" who had only pretended to be a Unionist to support his family's Confederate interests. It also rehashed accusations that Joseph Brown Heiskell had committed multiple atrocities during the war.

Heiskell helped organize the state's delegation to the National Union Convention in Philadelphia in August 1866. He remained only marginally active in politics in later years.

== Later life and family ==
Heiskell and his first wife Eliza had ten children, seven of whom lived into adulthood: Joseph Brown, Hugh Brown, Ann, Margaret, Susan, Carrick White, and Ferdinand. In 1853, two years after his first wife died, he married a widow, Alice Armstrong Fulkerson. They had two daughters, Blanche and Alice. Joseph and Carrick moved to Memphis after the Civil War; Joseph served as state attorney general in the 1870s, and Carrick served as a circuit court judge. Hugh Brown Heiskell was among the "49ers" who moved to California during the Gold Rush in the late 1840s. Frederick's grandson, John Netherland Heiskell, briefly served as a U.S. senator from Arkansas in 1913. A nephew, Samuel Gordon Heiskell (1858–1923), served several terms as Mayor of Knoxville between 1896 and 1915.

After Heiskell's second wife, Alice, died in 1874, he moved to a house in downtown Knoxville. He spent his final years living with his daughter in Rogersville, where he died in 1882. He was interred in Rogersville, though his family had made plans to have him reinterred at Ebenezer Cemetery near Knoxville.

An obituary "The Late Maj. F. S. Heiskell" published within the December 5, 1882 edition of the Knoxville Daily Chronicle ascribed and honored Heiskell as being a "Pioneer of Tennessee Journalism".
