= William Heiskell =

American politician (1788–1871)

Speaker of the Tennessee House of Representatives
- In office 1865–1867
- Preceded by: Edwin A. Keeble
- Succeeded by: F. S. Richardson

Personal details
- Born: 1788 Hagerstown, Maryland, United States
- Died: September 9, 1871 Knoxville, Tennessee
- Resting place: Old Gray Cemetery; Knoxville, Tennessee
- Party: Whig Party; Know Nothing
- Spouse: Julia Gahagan
- Relations: Frederick Heiskell (brother); Joseph B. Heiskell (nephew)
- Occupation: Planter

William Heiskell (1788 – September 9, 1871) was an American politician, active primarily in Tennessee, in the mid-19th century. He served a tumultuous term as Speaker of the Tennessee House of Representatives in the months following the Civil War, where he opposed the radical agenda of Governor William G. Brownlow, most notably refusing to sign the state house's ratification of the Fourteenth Amendment in 1866. A Whig, he had previously served a single term in the Tennessee House, from 1849 to 1851.

Heiskell opposed secession and supported the Union during the Civil War. He represented Monroe County at the East Tennessee Convention in 1861.

== Early life ==
Heiskell was born in Hagerstown, Maryland, one of nine children of Frederic and Catherine (Steidinger) Heiskell. While he was still young, his family moved to the Shenandoah Valley of Virginia. Later biographies, including one written by his son, Samuel G. Heiskell, state he served in the Virginia House of Delegates and was a delegate to Virginia's 1829–1830 constitutional convention, though he doesn't appear in the list of delegates in the latter's official proceedings.

In 1833, Heiskell moved to Monroe County, Tennessee, where he established a plantation in the Little Tennessee Valley. Aligning himself with the new Whig Party, he presided over the 1844 East Tennessee Whig Convention, which met at Knoxville to nominate candidates for that year's elections. He also championed railroad construction, helping to organize the East Tennessee and Georgia Railroad in the late 1840s.

In 1846, Heiskell ran on the Whig ticket for Monroe County's seat in the state legislature. His Democratic opponent, John Ramsey, successfully portrayed him as a flashy aristocrat who was fond of toddy and store-bought clothes, and Heiskell was defeated. He won the seat in the subsequent election, however, serving from 1849 to 1851.

== Civil War ==
Like many former East Tennessee Whigs, Heiskell opposed secession on the eve of the Civil War, and remained loyal to the Union during the course of the war. He described the nation as an "indestructible union of indestructible States." In 1861, he represented Monroe County at both the Knoxville and Greeneville sessions of the East Tennessee Convention, which would petition the Confederate-aligned state legislature to allow East Tennessee to break away and form a Union-aligned state. At the Knoxville session, he was appointed one of the convention's assistant vice presidents.

The Heiskell family was divided during the Civil War. William Heiskell and his brother, Frederick Heiskell, remained loyal to the Union. William's wife, Julia, however, supported the Confederacy, and Frederick's son, Joseph, served in the Confederate Congress. During the course of the war, Heiskell moved to Knoxville. After General Ambrose Burnside occupied the city in September 1863, William "Parson" Brownlow, a staunch pro-Unionist, was appointed special agent to the Treasury Department, and in turn hired Heiskell as an assistant.

In March 1864, Jim Heiskell, a former slave of Heiskell who had fled when Burnside occupied the city, alleged that Heiskell and an overseer had kidnapped and beaten him for running away. He further alleged that his brother, Robert, had been arrested for helping him escape. Heiskell denied the charge, and Brownlow defended him in a letter to the Treasury Department. No action was taken, though Jim Heiskell was given documents by General John Schofield asserting that he was a free citizen.

Toward the end of the war, Heiskell helped several former Confederates who were seeking pardons. Like many of the more conservative Unionists, he began to turn against Brownlow, who was seeking retribution against ex-Confederates. In a private letter, Heiskell's brother, Frederick, referred to Brownlow as an "unmitigated humbug."

== Speakership ==
In 1865, Heiskell was again elected to the Tennessee House of Representatives, this time representing Knox County. When the House convened on April 3, Heiskell was elected Speaker, defeating James R. Hood of Hamilton County by a vote of 37 to 29. Among the first orders of business was the ratification of the Thirteenth Amendment, which easily passed the House and was certified on April 7. The legislature also passed the "franchise law," which barred ex-Confederates from voting. Heiskell voted against the latter, prompting calls for his resignation from the allies of Brownlow, who was now governor.

Throughout the summer of 1865, the rift between Brownlow's allies, who had aligned themselves nationally with the Radical Republicans, and the "Conservative Unionists," who had aligned themselves with President Andrew Johnson, continued to grow. Conservative Unionists, led by Heiskell, were outraged when Brownlow threw out thousands of votes in the August 1865 congressional elections, allowing Radical candidate Samuel Arnell to win in the 6th district. The Conservatives also endorsed Johnson's veto of the Freedmen's Bureau bill in early 1866, which Radicals in Congress and Tennessee had championed.

In February 1866, Brownlow's allies in the legislature introduced a second franchise law, creating stricter voter registration requirements, and giving the governor the power to throw out entire counties' voter registrations. Conservatives vehemently opposed this bill, as they felt Brownlow had already abused the powers given to him by the first franchise law. Realizing they lacked the votes to stop the bill, several Conservatives withdrew from the House to prevent a quorum. When Representative James Mullins, a Brownlow ally, accused Heiskell of organizing the quorum-bust, Heiskell called Mullins a "God damned old liar and a damned thief" and threw his gavel at Mullins, nearly igniting a brawl. The law finally passed in May, after several more weeks of infighting.

The struggle between Radicals and Conservatives touched off an editorial war in newspapers across the state. The Pulaski Citizen endorsed Heiskell's stance, stating he had used his "best efforts" to maintain harmony and order in the legislature, and the Cleveland Banner stated that Mullins was "In the Legislature of Tennessee making an ass of himself." Frederick Heiskell, William's brother, published a "scathing" denunciation of Brownlow in the Knoxville Commercial. Brownlow's Whig derided Frederick Heiskell as a "superannuated, shallow-brained, malignant, personally corrupt man."

In July 1866, Brownlow called a special session of the legislature to consider the Fourteenth Amendment, which Radicals supported, but Conservatives, including Heiskell, opposed. After the amendment cleared the state senate, its opponents in the state house, lacking the votes to stop its passage, once again fled the Capitol to prevent a quorum. In response, the house sergeant-at-arms rounded up two and confined them to the committee room. Heiskell ruled that this did not constitute a quorum, but the house overrode his decision, and the amendment was passed. Heiskell refused to sign it, and resigned the speakership in disgust. The Speaker pro tempore, John Norman, signed the amendment, however, and Brownlow quickly certified its ratification.

== Later life, family and legacy ==
Heiskell died on September 9, 1871. He is interred with his wife, Julia, at Old Gray Cemetery in Knoxville.

Heiskell's brother, Frederick (1786–1882), was the cofounder of the Knoxville Register, and served one term in the Tennessee Senate (1847–1849). His son, Samuel Gordon Heiskell (1858–1923), served several terms as Mayor of Knoxville in the 1890s and early 1900s. A nephew, Joseph Brown Heiskell (1823–1913), served in the Tennessee Senate in the late 1850s, and represented the 1st district in the Confederate Congress during the Civil War. Another nephew, Carrick, was a prominent Memphis-area judge. John Netherland Heiskell, a great-nephew, briefly served as a U.S. Senator from Arkansas.

Heiskell was appointed to the Board of Trustees for East Tennessee University (the modern University of Tennessee) in 1865. He also served on the inaugural Board of Trustees of Hiwassee College. Two stained glass windows in the St. John's Episcopal Cathedral in downtown Knoxville are dedicated to Heiskell and his wife, Julia. Heiskell, Tennessee, a small community in northern Knox County, is named for the Heiskells.

== See also ==
- Charles Inman
- Samuel R. Rodgers
