= William J. Landram =

William Jennings Landram
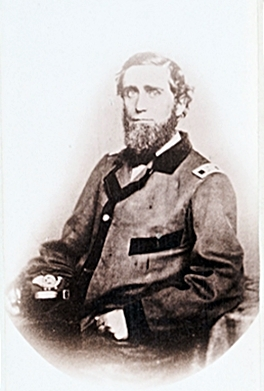
- Col. William J. Landram
- Born: February 11, 1828; Lancaster, Kentucky
- Died: October 11, 1895 (aged 67); Lancaster, Kentucky
- Burial place: Lancaster Cemetery
- Military career
- Allegiance: United States of America; Union
- Branch: United States Army; Union Army
- Service years: 1846–1847, 1861–1865
- Rank: Colonel; Brevet Brigadier General
- Unit: 1st Kentucky Volunteer Cavalry
- Commands: 19th Kentucky Infantry; 2nd Bde / 1st Div / XIII Corps; 2nd Bde / 10th Div / XIII Corps; 4th Division, XIII Corps
- Conflicts: Mexican–American War: Battle of Buena Vista; American Civil War: Battle of Chickasaw Bayou; Battle of Arkansas Post; Battle of Champion Hill; Battle of Big Black River Bridge; Siege of Vicksburg; Battle of Sabine Crossroads
- Other work: Chairman of the Republican Party of Kentucky

William Jennings Landram (February 11, 1828 – October 11, 1895) was a lawyer, publisher, and Union officer during the American Civil War. He served in many of the campaigns associated with the XIII Corps often in command of a brigade and occasionally in division command. His name is alternately spelled Landrum.

== Biography ==
=== Early life and education ===
Landram was born February 11, 1828, in Lancaster, Kentucky, to Louis Landram and Martha A. George, the first of many children. Landram's father, a native of Virginia was an attorney who relocated to Scott County, Kentucky, in the early 19th century. Landram's mother was a native of Garrard County, Kentucky, and niece of George Robertson, a prominent Kentucky politician and jurist.

Landram was educated in local private schools and in 1845 was appointed Clerk of the Circuit and County Courts for Garrard County. In 1849, he married Sarah A. Walker, with whom he had nine children.

=== Mexican War ===
On June 9, 1846, Landram enlisted as a private in Company A, 1st Kentucky Cavalry during the Mexican–American War. He was soon promoted to orderly sergeant. Landram fought in the Battle of Buena Vista February 22–23, 1847, where he received a saber wound in a shoulder. He mustered out of service June 8, 1847, and returned to his previous position in Lancaster.

=== Politics ===
From 1850 to 1851, Landram read law and published the Garrard Banner, a local Whig newspaper. Landram was elected Clerk of the Circuit Court for Garrard County, and was admitted to the bar in 1854. He was continually reelected to the position until the outbreak of the Civil War in 1861. Landram was a staunch supporter of John Bell and Edward Everett in the election of 1860. A supporter of emancipation, he voted in 1849 to abolish slavery in Kentucky. With the demise of the Whig party, Landram became a Republican.

=== Civil War ===
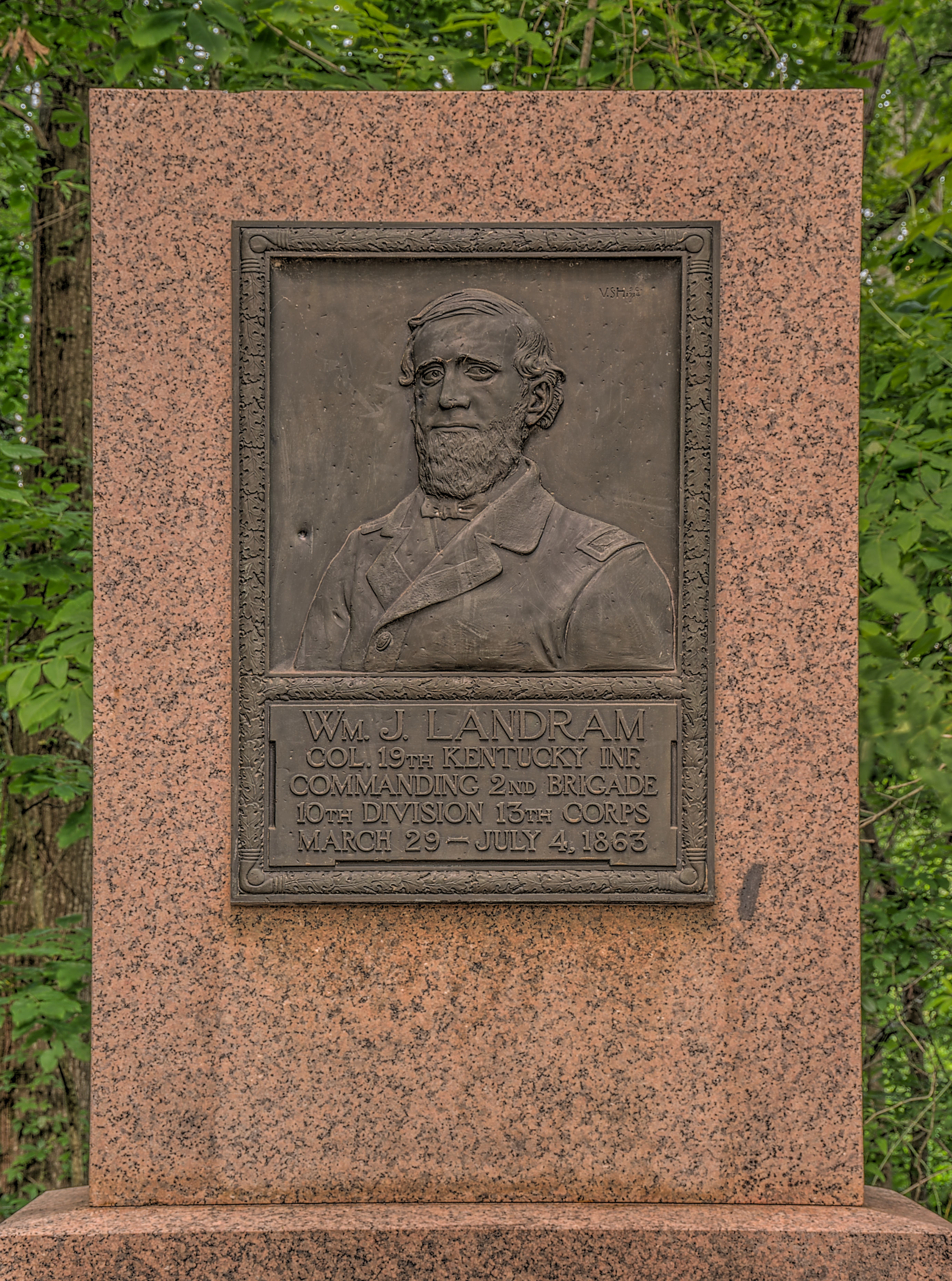
relief portrait of Landram at Vicksburg National Military Park

On July 15, 1861, the War Department authorized General William "Bull" Nelson to establish a training camp and organize a brigade of infantry. At Camp Dick Robinson, Nelson commissioned Landram, colonel of the 1st Kentucky Cavalry, but he resigned after a few days, preferring instead a commission in the infantry. Camp Dick Robinson figures importantly in the western theatre of the war at this point as the first Union recruiting and training center south of the Ohio River.

Landram was subsequently ordered by Brig. Gen. William T. Sherman, then in command of Kentucky, to Harrodsburg, Kentucky, where he recruited the 19th Kentucky Infantry, and was elected its colonel December 12, 1861.

Landram proved to be a capable officer and he participated in the battles of Chickasaw Bayou, Arkansas Post, Champion Hill, Black River Bridge, the siege of Vicksburg, the siege of Jackson, and finally the Red River Campaign. While in command of a division at the Battle of Sabine Crossroads, Landram was captured on April 8, 1864, immediately paroled, and later exchanged July 22, 1864.

On October 8, 1864, Landram was given command of the District of Baton Rouge. As a reward for meritorious service, Landram was promoted to brevet brigadier general of volunteers on March 13, 1865. When the war ended, he returned to his home in Lancaster.

=== Later life ===
Landram was appointed Collector of Internal Revenue for the Eighth Kentucky District by President Andrew Johnson in 1867, and was subsequently reappointed by President Ulysses S. Grant, holding the post until 1885. During this time, he served as chairman of the Republican Party of Kentucky. He was an elder in the Presbyterian Church for 42 years and a prominent member of the Freemasons. Landram applied for a disability pension in 1890. In a candid letter to U.S. Representative James B. McCreary dated October 27, 1890, Landram noted that he had contracted dysentery while on duty at Alexandria, Louisiana, on April 25, 1864, which led to chronic hemorrhoids. He wrote, "I own but little property of any kind, and am dependent upon a meagre [sic] law practice in a small town for the support of myself and family, six in number." Landram died on October 11, 1895, and was buried in Lancaster Cemetery.

== See also ==
- Kentucky in the Civil War
