= William Marmaduke Kavanaugh =

American politician

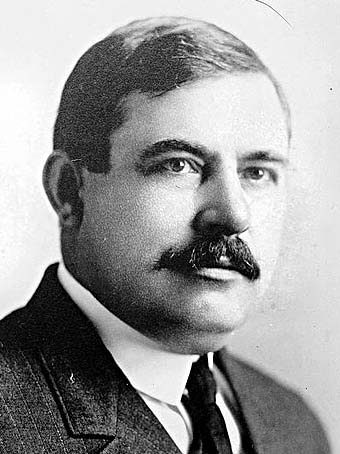

United States Senator from Arkansas
- In office January 29, 1913 – March 3, 1913
- Preceded by: John N. Heiskell
- Succeeded by: Joseph T. Robinson

Personal details
- Born: March 3, 1866 Eutaw, Alabama, U.S.
- Died: February 21, 1915 (aged 48) Little Rock, Arkansas, U.S.
- Party: Democratic

William Marmaduke Kavanaugh (March 3, 1866 – February 21, 1915) was a Democratic United States senator from Arkansas.

== Biography ==
William Marmaduke Kavanaugh was born near Eutaw, Alabama on March 3, 1866. Kavanaugh attended public schools in Kentucky and graduated from the Kentucky Military Institute at Farmdale, Kentucky in 1885.

Kavanaugh moved to Little Rock, Arkansas where he worked as a newspaper reporter and later as editor and manager of the Arkansas Gazette.

Kavanaugh then entered politics and was elected sheriff and tax collector of Pulaski County, Arkansas where he served from 1896 to 1900. He then served as a county and probate judge from 1900 to 1904. He then turned his attention to business and began a varied career in banking, street railway, and gas supply. From 1912 to 1915 he served as a member of the Democratic National Committee.

Kavanaugh was elected to the United States Senate to fill the vacancy caused by the death of Jeff Davis. He served in the Senate from January 29 until March 3, 1913. He later served as director of the Lakes to Gulf Deep Waterways Association.

He was the president of the Southern Association, one of professional baseball's principal minor leagues, from 1903 until his death.

William Marmaduke Kavanaugh died in Little Rock, Arkansas on February 21, 1915, and is buried in Oakland Cemetery in Little Rock.

U.S. Senate
Preceded by John Netherland Heiskell	U.S. Senator (Class 2) from Arkansas; 1913	Succeeded by Joseph Taylor Robinson
