= Green Adams =

American politician (1812–1884)

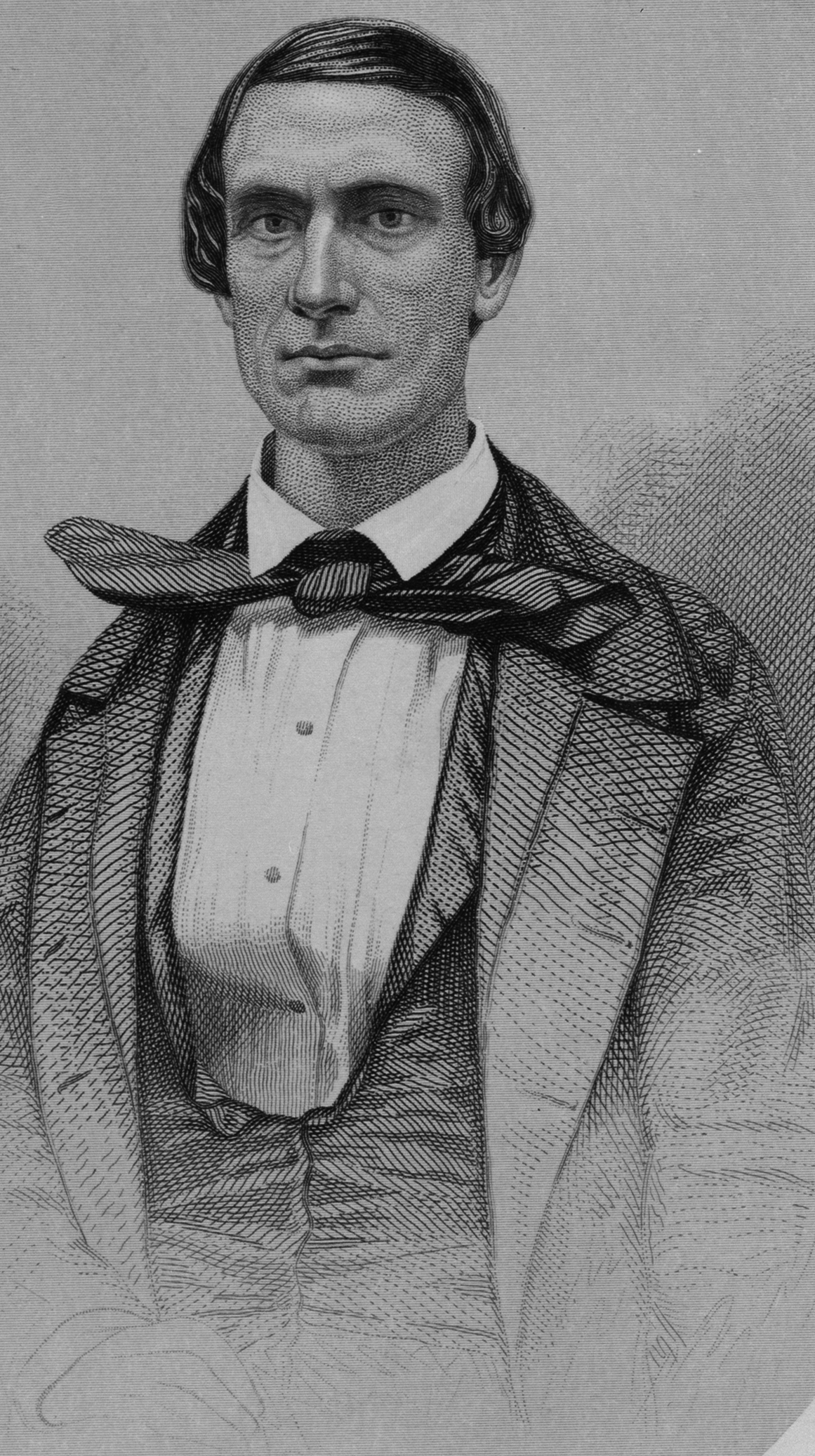

Member of the U.S. House of Representatives from Kentucky's 6th district
- In office March 4, 1859 – March 3, 1861
- Preceded by: John Milton Elliott
- Succeeded by: George W. Dunlap

Member of the U.S. House of Representatives from Kentucky's 6th district
- In office March 4, 1847 – March 3, 1849
- Preceded by: John Preston Martin
- Succeeded by: Daniel Breck

Personal details
- Born: August 20, 1812 Barbourville, Kentucky, U.S.
- Died: January 18, 1884 (aged 71) Philadelphia, Pennsylvania, U.S.
- Resting place: West Laurel Hill Cemetery, Bala Cynwyd, Pennsylvania, U.S.
- Party: Opposition Party
- Other political affiliations: Whig
- Relations: George Madison Adams (nephew)
- Profession: Politician, lawyer

Green Adams (August 20, 1812 – January 18, 1884) was an American politician who served as a Whig member of the United States House of Representatives for Kentucky from 1847 to 1849 and as an Opposition Party member from 1859 to 1861. He was a member of the Kentucky House of Representatives in 1839, a judge in the Kentucky Circuit Court from 1851 to 1856, and the sixth auditor of the United States Treasury Department from 1861 to 1864

== Biography ==
He was born in Barbourville, Kentucky, on August 20, 1812. He worked as a farmer, studied law and was admitted to the bar. He served as deputy sheriff in Knox County from 1832 to 1833. In 1839, he was elected to the Kentucky House of Representatives. In 1844, he served as a presidential elector for the Whig Party. He was elected as a member of the Whig Party to the United States House of Representatives from Kentucky in 1847, remaining in that capacity through 1849. He was made a judge of the Circuit Court of Kentucky in 1851, remaining there though 1856. In 1859, he was reelected to the United States Congress for one term on the Opposition Party ticket.

After the secession of South Carolina from the United States, but before the inauguration of President Abraham Lincoln, the House of Representatives attempted to pass legislation to coerce the reintegration of successionist states back into the United States. He was a slave owner, but also one of the only congressmen from Southern states to support coercion besides Henry Winter Davis of Baltimore.

In 1861, he was appointed the sixth auditor of the United States Treasury Department, remaining there through 1864. He served as disbursing clerk for the United States House of Representatives from 1875 to 1881.

He practiced law in Philadelphia, Pennsylvania. He died in Philadelphia on January 18, 1884, and was interred at West Laurel Hill Cemetery in Bala Cynwyd, Pennsylvania.

U.S. House of Representatives
Preceded by John P. Martin	Member of the U.S. House of Representatives from Kentucky's 6th congressional district 1847 – 1849	Succeeded by Daniel Breck
Preceded by John M. Elliott	Member of the U.S. House of Representatives from Kentucky's 6th congressional district 1859 – 1861	Succeeded by George W. Dunlap
