= John Preston Martin =

American politician (1811–1862)

Member of the Kentucky Senate
- In office 1855–1859

Member of the U.S. House of Representatives from Kentucky's 6th district
- In office March 4, 1845 – March 3, 1847
- Preceded by: John White
- Succeeded by: Green Adams

Member of the Kentucky House of Representatives
- In office 1841–1843

Personal details
- Born: October 11, 1811 near Jonesville, Virginia, U.S.
- Died: December 23, 1862 (aged 51) Prestonsburg, Kentucky, U.S.
- Resting place: May Cemetery
- Party: Democratic
- Occupation: Politician

John Preston Martin (October 11, 1811 – December 23, 1862) was a political figure in Kentucky in the early 19th century. He was born on October 11, 1811, near Jonesville, Lee County, Virginia. He moved to Prestonsburg, Floyd County, Kentucky in 1828. He served in the State House of Representatives from 1841 through 1843.

Martin served in the 29th United States Congress from 1845 through 1847. He was not a candidate for renomination. He served in the Kentucky State Senate from 1855 through 1859, and was a delegate to the Democratic National Convention in 1856. He died in Prestonsburg on December 23, 1862. He is buried in May Cemetery.

== Places named for John P. Martin ==
- Martin County, Kentucky

U.S. House of Representatives
Preceded by John White	Member of the U.S. House of Representatives from Kentucky's 6th congressional district 1845 – 1847	Succeeded by Green Adams
