= 19th Kentucky Infantry Regiment =

- Active: January 2, 1862, to January 26, 1865
- Country: United States
- Allegiance: Union
- Branch: Infantry
- Engagements: Battle of the Cumberland Gap (June 1862) Campaign March 28-June 18; Battle of Chickasaw Bayou; Battle of Arkansas Post; Battle of Port Gibson; Battle of Champion Hill; Siege of Vicksburg, May 19 & 22 assaults Jackson Expedition; Red River Campaign; Battle of Sabine Cross Roads; Battle of Pleasant Hill

The 19th Kentucky Infantry Regiment was an infantry regiment that served in the Union Army during the American Civil War.

== Service ==
The 19th Kentucky Infantry Regiment was organized at Camp Harwood in Harrodsburg, Kentucky and mustered in for a three-year enlistment on January 2, 1862, under the command of Colonel William Jennings Landram.

The regiment was attached to 20th Brigade, Army of the Ohio, to February 1862. 20th Brigade, 6th Division, Army of the Ohio, to March 1862. 27th Brigade, 7th Division, Army of the Ohio, to October 1862. 2nd Brigade, 1st Division, Army of Kentucky, Department of the Ohio, to November, 1862. 2nd Brigade, 10th Division, Right Wing, XIII Corps, Army of the Tennessee, to December 1862. 2nd Brigade, 1st Division, Sherman's Yazoo Expedition, to January 1863. 2nd Brigade, 10th Division, XIII Corps, Army of the Tennessee, to August 1863. 2nd Brigade, 4th Division, XIII Corps, Department of the Gulf, to March 1864. 1st Brigade, 4th Division, XIII Corps, to June 1864. Defenses of New Orleans, Louisiana, June 1864. District of Baton Rouge, Louisiana, to January 1865.

The 19th Kentucky Infantry mustered out of service at Louisville, Kentucky, on January 26, 1865. Veterans and new recruits were transferred to the 7th Kentucky Veteran Volunteer Infantry.

== Detailed service ==
Moved to Somerset, Ky., January 1862, and duty there until April. Battle of the Cumberland Gap (June 1862) Campaign March 28-June 18. At Cumberland Ford until June. Occupation of Cumberland Gap June 18-September 16. Evacuation of Cumberland Gap and retreat to Greenupsburg (now called Greenup in Greenup County, KY) on the Ohio River September 16-October 3. Expedition to Charleston, Va., October 21-November 10. Moved to Memphis, Tenn., November 10–15, and duty there until December 20, Sherman's Yazoo Expedition December 20, 1862, to January 3, 1863. Chickasaw Bayou December 26–28. Battle of Chickasaw Bayou December 29. Expedition to Arkansas Post, Ark., January 3–10, 1863. Assault and capture of Fort Hindman, Battle of Arkansas Post, January 10–11. Moved to Young's Point, La., January 15–22, and duty there until March 10. Expedition to Fort Pemberton and Greenwood March 10-April 5. Moved to Milliken's Bend, La., April 5–8. Movement on Bruinsburg and turning Grand Gulf April 25–30. Battle of Port Gibson, Miss., May 1; Battle of Champion Hill May 16; Battle of Big Black River Bridge May 17. Siege of Vicksburg May 18-July 4. Assaults on Vicksburg May 19 and 22, Surrender of Vicksburg July 4. Advance on Jackson, Miss., July 5–10. Siege of Jackson July 10–17. Camp at Big Black until August 13. Ordered to New Orleans, La., August 13. Duty at Carrollton, Brashear City and Berwick until October. Western Louisiana Campaign October 3-November 30. Grand Coteau (Battle of Bayou Bourbeux) November 3. At New Iberia until December 19. Moved to New Orleans December 19, thence to Madisonville January 19, and duty there until March. Red River Campaign March 10-May 22. Advance from Franklin to Alexandria March 14–26. Battle of Sabine Cross Roads also known as Battle of Mansfield April 8. Bayou de Paul April 8. Battle of Pleasant Hill April 9. Cane River Crossing Battle of Monett's Ferry April 22–23. At Alexandria April 27-May 13. Near Alexandria May 2–9. Retreat to Morganza April 13–20. Mansura May 16. Moved to Baton Rouge, La., May 29, and duty there until January 1865. Ordered to Louisville, Ky., January 1865.

== Casualties ==
The regiment lost a total of 198 men during service; 1 officer and 42 enlisted men killed or mortally wounded, 3 officers and 152 enlisted men died of disease.

== Commanders ==
- Colonel William Jennings Landram
- Lieutenant Colonel John Cowan - commanded at the battle of Vicksburg
- Major Josiah J. Mann - commanded at the battle of Vicksburg

== See also ==
- List of Kentucky Civil War Units
- Kentucky in the Civil War
