= Thomas H. Coldwell =

Former Attorney general of Tennessee

Thomas Harvey Coldwell (August 29, 1822 – March 10, 1891), was an American lawyer who served as Attorney General and Reporter of Tennessee from 1865 to 1870, during the state’s Reconstruction era. Coldwell entered office shortly after Governor William G. Brownlow took power in 1865, and he supervised the state’s appellate litigation while issuing legal opinions to the executive branch on matters ranging from state-aided railroads to the restoration of civil order. He is widely identified as a Republican, and—until the 2014 selection of Herbert H. Slatery III—was regarded as the last Republican to hold the office during the post-Civil War period.

Coldwell was born in Shelbyville, Tennessee on August 29, 1822. He was the eldest of the four children of John Campbell Coldwell, who served as a sergeant and later sergeant major with President Andrew Jackson in the Creek War and the War of 1812, and his wife Jane Northcott Coldwell. Thomas Coldwell was educated at the Dixon Academy and then studied law under local attorney Irwin J. Frierson, receiving his license to practice in January 1844.

As a prominent Shelbyville Union supporter in 1863, Confederate General Braxton Bragg ordered Coldwell to be arrested and taken as a prisoner to his Tullahoma, Tennessee headquarters. Learning of this, his younger sister Mary Summers Fite, the widow of Confederate officer Jacob Cross Fite, traveled to Tullahoma from Shady Side, a Bedford County plantation near Shelbyville which the young couple had originally received as a gift from her parents. She met with General Bragg, secured her brother's release and brought him safely back home to Shelbyville. In 1864, Governor Andrew Johnson appointed Coldwell as a chancery court judge, but he only served in the position for a short time.

Contemporary and historical state references list Coldwell in the succession of attorneys general that bridged the end of the Civil War and Tennessee’s “Redemption” in 1869–70. Scholarly accounts of Reconstruction in Tennessee also quote Attorney General Coldwell’s contemporaneous conclusions in disputes involving Radical/Unionist officeholders.

Coldwell was succeeded in 1870 by Joseph Brown Heiskell, as political power shifted in the state at the close of Reconstruction.

Coldwell returned to Shelbyville and became a civic leader there. In 1871, Governor Dewitt C. Senter recommended him to President Ulysses S. Grant as State of Tennessee commissioner for the Centennial Exposition in Philadelphia. He served as one of the vice presidents of the organizing commission until 1877.

Coldwell was married and widowed four times. He died at his home in Shelbyville on March 10, 1891 and was interred at the Willow Mount Cemetery in his hometown. Two children survived him: a son by his third wife and a daughter by his fourth wife. His son Ernest Coldwell also became an attorney. In 1881, he was appointed to the staff of Governor Alvin Hawkins with the rank of brigadier general. In 1884, Ernest Coldwell was elected as a Republican representative of Bedford County to Tennessee's 44th General Assembly session in 1885.

== Source ==
- "Letter, Thomas H. Coldwell in Shelbyville, Tenn. to W. G. Brownlow, 1867 July 10 | SCOUT". scout.lib.utk.edu.
