= Senator Haskell (disambiguation) =

Floyd Haskell (1916–1998), U.S. Senator from Colorado from 1973 to 1979. Senator Haskell may also refer to:

- Anne Haskell (born 1943), Maine State Senate
- Nathaniel M. Haskell (1912–1983), Maine State Senate
- Robert Haskell (1903–1987), Maine State Senate
- Will Haskell (born 1996), Connecticut State Senate

== See also ==
- Charles C. Hascall (1796–1862), Michigan State Senate
- Senator Heiskell (disambiguation)
