= Addison White =

American politician (1824–1909)

Member of the U.S. House of Representatives from Kentucky's 6th district
- In office March 4, 1851 – March 3, 1853
- Preceded by: Daniel Breck
- Succeeded by: John M. Elliott

Personal details
- Born: May 1, 1824 Abingdon, Virginia
- Died: February 4, 1909 (aged 84) Huntsville, Alabama
- Resting place: Maple Hill Cemetery
- Party: Whig
- Parent: Colonel James White (father)
- Relatives: John White(cousin); John D. White(nephew)
- Education: Princeton College
- Profession: Politician, Lawyer, Businessman

Addison White (May 1, 1824 – February 4, 1909) was an American politician who served the state of Kentucky in the United States House of Representatives between 1851 and 1853.

== Biography ==
Addison White was born in Abingdon, Washington County, Virginia on May 1, 1824, to Colonel James White. The Whites were considered the "First Family" of Clay County, Kentucky. Addison's father was among the richest men in America due to his myriad business interests including salt mining which lead to his nickname "The King of Salt."

He graduated from Princeton College in 1844. In 1850, he was elected as a Whig to the U.S. House of Representatives, serving one term. Addison's 1st cousin, John White preceded his service and his nephew John D. White followed him, also representing Kentucky. He was also a cousin removed of Hugh Lawson White, Brigadier General James White, and Joseph Lanier Williams.

White served in the Confederate States Army during the American Civil War.

After the war, he moved to Huntsville, Alabama and became a successful businessman and died there on February 4, 1909. He was buried in Maple Hill Cemetery in Huntsville.

U.S. House of Representatives
Preceded by Daniel Breck	Member of the U.S. House of Representatives from Kentucky's 6th congressional district 1851 - 1853	Succeeded by John M. Elliott
