= John Milton Elliott =

American politician (1820–1879)

John Elliott
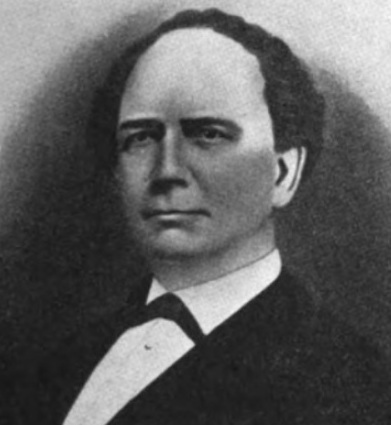

Member of the U.S. House of Representatives from Kentucky's 6th district
- In office March 4, 1853 – March 3, 1859
- Preceded by: Addison White
- Succeeded by: Green Adams

Member of the Kentucky House of Representatives
- In office August 5, 1861 – December 21, 1861
- Preceded by: Samuel Salyers
- Succeeded by: Thomas S. Brown
- In office 1847–1848

Personal details
- Born: John Milton Elliott; May 16, 1820 Scott County, Virginia, U.S.
- Died: March 26, 1879 (aged 58) Frankfort, Kentucky, U.S.
- Party: Democratic
- Education: Emory and Henry College (BA)

John Milton Elliott (May 16, 1820 – March 26, 1879) was an American lawyer, politician, and judge from Prestonsburg, Kentucky. He was assassinated by a fellow judge. Elliott represented Kentucky in the United States House of Representatives from 1853 until 1857, and served in the First Confederate Congress during the American Civil War.

== Life and career ==
Elliott was born in Scott County, Virginia, on May 16, 1820, to John and Jane Elliott. The family moved to Kentucky during his childhood, with his father serving two terms in the Kentucky General Assembly. In 1841, he began practicing law in Prestonsburg, Kentucky. He was elected to the Kentucky House of Representatives in 1847, representing Floyd, Pike, and Johnson Counties. He later followed it with a stint in the U.S. House of Representatives from 1853 to 1859.

In 1861 he went back to the Kentucky legislature, but was expelled by Judge Bland Ballard on December 21, 1861, for giving aid to the Confederate States of America. He then turned his loyalties to the Confederacy, helping to form the Confederate government of Kentucky, and served in its Senate as a Senator from Kentucky.

After the war, he moved to Bath County, Kentucky. In 1876, Elliott began serving on the Kentucky Court of Appeals.

=== Murdered by a fellow judge ===
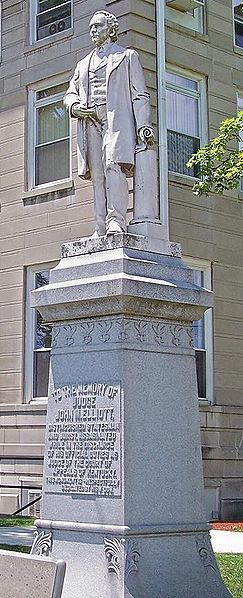
Statue of Elliott at Boyd County Courthouse at Catlettsburg, Kentucky

On March 26, 1879, Judge Elliott and fellow jurist Thomas Hines left the Kentucky State House, when they met a judge from Henry County, Kentucky, Colonel Thomas Buford. Buford's late sister had lost her land to pay back a debt of $20,000; Elliott had ruled against her in a court proceeding in which she had attempted to save the property.

After Hines had turned and walked away from Elliott, Buford asked Elliott whether he wanted to go on a snipe hunt, then shot him point-blank with a double-barreled 12 gauge shotgun loaded with buckshot, as he had sworn on his sister's grave he would do. Hines inspected the body as Buford turned himself in to a deputy sheriff who had come to see where the shotgun blast came from.

The assassination made news throughout the country. The New York Times opined that the murder "could scarcely have taken place in any region calling itself civilized except Kentucky, or some other Southern state".

=== Aftermath ===
Buford offered a defense of not guilty by reason of insanity during his trial. The jury did indeed find him insane, after an initial 6–6 deadlock. Buford was sent to the Central Kentucky Insane Asylum in Anchorage, Kentucky, but would eventually escape in 1882 to Indiana, where he was unable to be extradited from. He voluntarily returned to the asylum in 1884 and died on February 12, 1885.

Elliott was buried at Frankfort Cemetery in Frankfort, Kentucky. His wife had a statue erected in his honor at the courthouse of Boyd County, Kentucky in Catlettsburg, Kentucky. It is debated whether Elliott County, Kentucky is named for Elliott or his father.

== See also ==
- List of assassinated American politicians

U.S. House of Representatives
Preceded by Addison White	Member of the U.S. House of Representatives from Kentucky's 6th congressional district 1853–1859	Succeeded by Green Adams
Confederate States House of Representatives
New seat	Member of the C.S. Provisional Congress from Kentucky; 1861	Seat abolished
