= Samuel Powell (Tennessee politician) =

American politician (1776–1841)

Member of the U.S. House of Representatives from Tennessee's 1st district
- In office March 4, 1815 – March 3, 1817
- Preceded by: John Rhea
- Succeeded by: John Rhea

Personal details
- Born: July 10, 1776 Norristown, Pennsylvania
- Died: August 2, 1841 (aged 65) Rogersville, Tennessee
- Party: Democratic-Republican
- Spouse: Mary Rutledge Powell
- Children: George Rutledge Powel; Robert Davis Powel; Samuel Jackson Powel
- Education: Philadelphia College
- Profession: Lawyer; Judge; Politician; Educator

Samuel Powell (July 10, 1776 – August 2, 1841), was an American politician who represented Tennessee in the United States House of Representatives.

== Biography ==
Powell was born in Norristown, Pennsylvania. He attended the common schools and Philadelphia College, studied law, and was admitted to bar in Norristown prior to 1800.

== Career ==
In 1800, Powell moved to Blountville, Tennessee, where he established the first law school in Tennessee at his home since he was new to the area and needed to establish a following. He married Mary Rutledge, daughter of General George Rutledge, a prominent citizen of Sullivan County. In 1805, he moved to Rogersville, Tennessee, and practiced law. From 1807 to 1809, he served as a member of the superior court of law and equity. He was a judge of the first circuit court of Tennessee in 1812–1813. He was a law mentor to future attorney and state politician John Netherland.

Powell was elected as a Democratic-Republican to the Fourteenth Congress, which lasted from March 4, 1815, to March 3, 1817. He was not a candidate for renomination in 1816.

After departing Congress, Powell resumed the practice of law, and he was again a judge of the first circuit court of Tennessee from 1819 to 1841.

== Death ==
Powell died in Rogersville, Tennessee, on August 2, 1841, at age 65, and is interred at the Old Presbyterian Cemetery.

U.S. House of Representatives
Preceded by John Rhea	Member of the U.S. House of Representatives from Tennessee's 1st congressional district 1815-1817	Succeeded by John Rhea
