= Daniel Breck =

American politician (1788–1871)

Member of the U.S. House of Representatives from Kentucky's 6th district
- In office March 4, 1849 – March 3, 1851
- Preceded by: Green Adams
- Succeeded by: Addison White

Justice of the Kentucky Court of Appeals
- In office April 7, 1843 – 1849

Member of the Kentucky House of Representatives from Madison County
- In office 1834–1835
- Preceded by: multi-member district
- Succeeded by: multi-member district

Member of the Kentucky House of Representatives from Madison County
- In office 1824–1828
- Preceded by: multi-member district
- Succeeded by: multi-member district

Personal details
- Born: February 12, 1788 Topsfield, Massachusetts
- Died: February 4, 1871 (aged 82) Richmond, Kentucky
- Party: Whig
- Relations: Samuel Breck (brother)
- Education: Dartmouth College

Daniel Breck (February 12, 1788 – February 4, 1871) was a member of the U.S. House of Representatives from Kentucky.

== Biography ==
Daniel Breck (brother of Samuel Breck) was born in Topsfield, Massachusetts. He graduated from Dartmouth College in Hanover, New Hampshire, in 1812. He studied law, was admitted to the bar in 1814, and commenced practice in Richmond, Kentucky, in October of the same year. He was a judge of the Richmond County Court. He was a member of the Kentucky House of Representatives from 1824 to 1827 and again in 1834. He was president of the Richmond branch of the State Bank of Kentucky from 1835 to 1843. He was appointed associate judge of the Kentucky Court of Appeals on April 7, 1843, and served until 1849. He owned slaves.

Breck was elected as a Whig to the Thirty-First Congress. He returned to Richmond, Kentucky, and again served as president of the Richmond branch of the State Bank. He died in Richmond on February 4, 1871, and is buried at Richmond Cemetery.

U.S. House of Representatives
Preceded by Green Adams	Member of the U.S. House of Representatives from Kentucky's 6th congressional district 1849–1851	Succeeded by Addison White
