= Halmor Hull Emmons =

American judge (1814–1877)

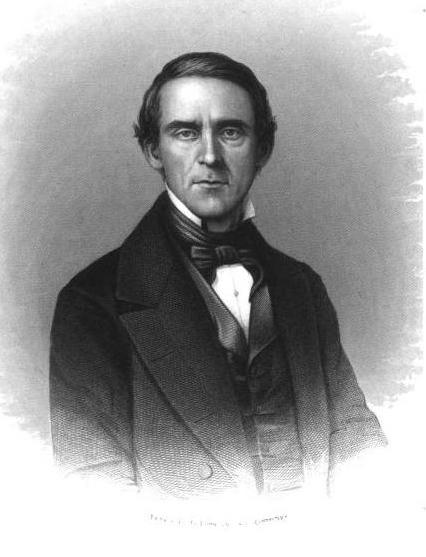

Judge of the United States Circuit Courts for the Sixth Circuit
- In office January 17, 1870 – May 14, 1877
- Appointed by: Ulysses S. Grant
- Preceded by: Seat established by 16 Stat. 44
- Succeeded by: John Baxter

Personal details
- Born: Halmor Hull Emmons; November 22, 1814 Keeseville, New York
- Died: May 14, 1877 (aged 62) Detroit, Michigan
- Education: read law
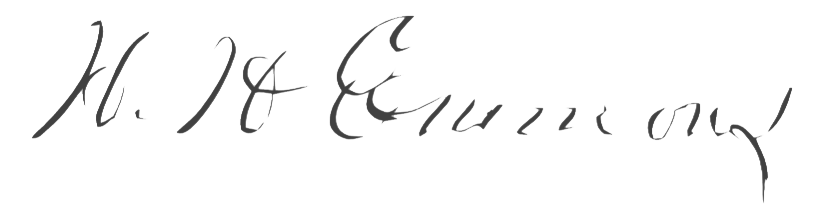
- Signature

Halmor Hull Emmons (November 22, 1814 – May 14, 1877) was a United States circuit judge of the United States Circuit Courts for the Sixth Circuit.

== Education and career ==
Born in Keeseville, New York, Emmons read law to enter the bar. He was in private practice in Keeseville and Essex, New York in 1837, in Cleveland, Ohio from 1837 to 1838, and then in Detroit, Michigan until 1870.

== Federal judicial service ==
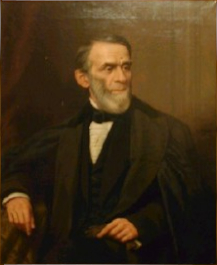
Judicial portrait of Emmons, 1876, by L. T. Ives.

Emmons was nominated by President Ulysses S. Grant on January 10, 1870, to the United States Circuit Courts for the Sixth Circuit, to a new seat authorized by 16 Stat. 44. He was confirmed by the United States Senate on January 17, 1870, and received his commission the same day. His service terminated on May 14, 1877, due to his death in Detroit.

Legal offices
Preceded by Seat established by 16 Stat. 44	Judge of the United States Circuit Courts for the Sixth Circuit; 1870–1877	Succeeded by John Baxter
