= John Baxter (judge) =

American politician

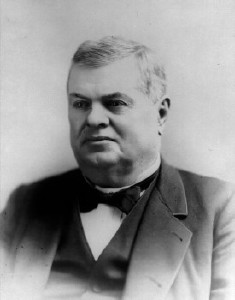

Judge of the United States Circuit Courts for the Sixth Circuit
- In office December 13, 1877 – April 2, 1886
- Appointed by: Rutherford B. Hayes
- Preceded by: Halmor Hull Emmons
- Succeeded by: Howell Edmunds Jackson

Speaker of the North Carolina House of Representatives
- In office 1852–1854
- Preceded by: James C. Dobbin
- Succeeded by: Samuel P. Hill

Personal details
- Born: John Baxter; March 5, 1819 Rutherford County, North Carolina, U.S.
- Died: April 2, 1886 (aged 67) Hot Springs, Arkansas, U.S.
- Resting place: Old Gray Cemetery; Knoxville, Tennessee, U.S.
- Party: Whig (Before 1854); Constitutional Union (1860–1864); Democratic (1864–1872); Liberal Republican (1872–1876); Republican (1876–1886)
- Education: read law

John Baxter (March 5, 1819 – April 2, 1886) was an American attorney and jurist who served as a United States circuit judge of the United States Circuit Courts for the Sixth Circuit from 1877 to 1886. Initially a Whig, he had previously served several terms in the North Carolina House of Commons, including one term as Speaker, before moving to Knoxville, Tennessee to practice law.

Baxter opposed secession on the eve of the American Civil War, and was a delegate to the East Tennessee Convention, which sought to create a separate, Union-aligned state in East Tennessee. He subsequently took the Oath of Allegiance to the Confederacy, in part to provide legal defense for Unionists charged in Confederate courts. Those he defended during the course of the war included several members of the East Tennessee bridge-burning conspiracy and several participants of the Great Locomotive Chase. He ran unsuccessfully for the Confederate Congress in September 1861. By mid-1862, he had returned to his pro-Union stance.

Baxter supported Democratic presidential candidate George B. McClellan in 1864, but would eventually join the Republican Party. In 1870, he was a delegate to the state constitutional convention that created the current Tennessee State Constitution.

== Early life ==
Baxter was born in Rutherford County, North Carolina, the son of William and Catherine (Lee) Baxter. His father, William, was described as a "thrifty and wealthy" farmer who had immigrated from Northern Ireland in 1789. Young John initially worked as a merchant in South Carolina, but found it unfulfilling, and turned to the study of law. He read law and was admitted to the bar in 1841, initially practicing in Rutherford County before moving to Henderson County, North Carolina in 1845.

Baxter aligned himself politically with the burgeoning Whig Party. In 1844, he was an elector for presidential candidate Henry Clay. His political activities included ten years of service as a member of the North Carolina General Assembly, spread across three separate periods. The first was from 1842 to 1843, representing Rutherford County, then from 1846 to 1848, and finally from 1852 to 1857, representing Henderson County. He served as Speaker for the 1852 session.

By the end of his final term in the legislature, Baxter began seeking greater opportunities than Western North Carolina afforded. On the advice of fellow attorney and Whig, Oliver Perry Temple, Baxter relocated to Knoxville, Tennessee (in 1857), which lay across the Great Smoky Mountains to the west. Temple later recalled that Baxter's first argument before a Knoxville court was "so clear and strong that it marked him at once as one of the leaders of the Knoxville bar."

In describing Baxter's courtroom style, Temple stated that he quickly seized upon the key facts of the case, ignoring minor or insignificant points. He only showed deference to precedent if it sustained his case. Temple wrote that while Baxter was not very well-read, he nevertheless possessed a "massive" intellect which was "astute and logical." By the outbreak of the Civil War, Baxter's earnings from his law practice had made him one of the wealthiest men in Knoxville.

== Civil War ==
Although a slaveholder, Baxter opposed secession during the sectional crisis that swept the South in the wake of the election of Abraham Lincoln in November 1860. In an article entitled, "What Shall the South Do?", which was published in the November 24, 1860, edition of the Knoxville Whig, Baxter called for a convention of delegates from all Southern states, believing it would provide an opportunity to calm the secession fervor in the lower South.

In February 1861, Baxter was one of Knox County's pro-Union candidates for a proposed statewide convention to consider secession. Along with Temple and ex-Whig leaders such as William G. Brownlow, Horace Maynard, and John Netherland, he canvassed the region to rally support for the Union. Temple would later write that no one in Tennessee was "so bitter in denunciation of secession and its leaders" than Baxter.

At the East Tennessee Convention's Greeneville session in June 1861, Baxter was a member of the Knox County delegation, along with Temple, Brownlow and Maynard. This convention, which met just after Tennessee voted to secede, petitioned the state legislature to allow East Tennessee to withdraw from the state and form a separate, Union-aligned state. Baxter spoke out against a series of resolutions proposed by T.A.R. Nelson that threatened the use of force if the legislature refused the convention's demands. He supported a more peaceful set of resolutions authored by Temple, which were eventually adopted.

Following the Confederate victory at the Battle of Bull Run in late July, Baxter gradually abandoned his campaign against secession, and began to reconcile with the new Confederate government. In September 1861, he took the Oath of Allegiance to the Confederacy, in part to provide legal assistance to Unionists who had been arrested, and in part because he felt the North could not defeat the South in a war. While many secessionists, such as Landon Carter Haynes, welcomed Baxter's defection, others, such as Knoxville Register editor J. Austin Sperry, doubted his sincerity. In September 1861, Baxter ran for the district's seat in the Confederate Congress, but was badly defeated by William G. Swan.

Baxter spent much of late 1861 and early 1862 defending Unionists who had been charged with various crimes by Confederate authorities. In August 1861, he travelled to Richmond, Virginia, to help secure the release of Nelson, who had been arrested. In the aftermath of the East Tennessee bridge-burnings in November 1861, Baxter defended many of the accused conspirators. In late December, he again travelled to Richmond to help secure the release of Brownlow, who had been jailed in Knoxville. In February 1862, Baxter launched a newspaper, the East Tennessean, the purpose of which was to reconcile Southern Unionists with the Confederacy.

By the spring of 1862, Baxter was again waffling on the disunion issue. He delivered a speech in which he stated there was no hope for the Confederacy, provoking the ire of General Edmund Kirby Smith. Shortly afterward, General Albert Sidney Johnston, at the request of Smith, arrested Baxter while he was on a business trip to Memphis. Though he was released after a few days, Baxter angrily returned to a pro-Union stance, charging Governor Isham G. Harris with orchestrating the arrest.

In June 1862, Temple and Baxter provided legal defense for twelve Union soldiers facing court-martial in Knoxville for their participation in the guerilla operation known as the "Great Locomotive Chase", or Andrews' Raid. Of the twelve, seven went to trial before the prisoners were moved to Chattanooga. Temple and Baxter argued the raiders were essentially Union Army personnel, not spies or saboteurs, and should therefore have been treated as prisoners of war. All seven were found guilty, and sentenced to hang.

When Union forces occupied Knoxville in September 1863, Baxter was recognized as a friend of the Union, and was appointed to the East Tennessee Relief Association, which provided aid to Unionists who had suffered at the hands of the Confederacy. Baxter disagreed with Lincoln's Emancipation Proclamation, and supported George B. McClellan in the presidential election of 1864. This provoked the wrath of Brownlow, who would align himself with the Radical Republicans, and the two would assail one another in newspaper columns in subsequent years.

== Postwar activities ==
Following the war, Baxter helped ex-Confederates in Knoxville prepare pardon applications. At the same time, however, he led a movement to purge ex-Confederate members of East Tennessee University's Board of Trustees.

In the late 1860s, a feud erupted between Baxter and mercurial Knoxville businessman Joseph Mabry. Mabry had been president of the bankrupt Knoxville and Kentucky Railroad, which had been issued millions of dollars in state bonds. In July 1869, Baxter sued Mabry, charging him with looting the company. Mabry likewise accused Baxter of committing fraud in his dealings with the Mineral Home Railroad. The two viciously attacked one another in newspaper columns in early 1870, and sued one another for libel. Finally, on June 13, 1870, Mabry shot Baxter in front of the Lamar House Hotel in downtown Knoxville. Though armed, Baxter ran away. Mabry was arrested, but Baxter did not press charges.

In January 1870, Baxter was elected Knox County's delegate to the convention which created the current Tennessee State Constitution. At the convention, Baxter was appointed Chairman of both the Bill of Rights Committee and Impeachments Committee, and served on the Permanent Rules Committee, the Common Schools Committee, and the Judiciary Committee. The Bill of Rights Committee drafted Article I ("Declaration of Rights") of the constitution. Baxter introduced the amendment establishing a poll tax.

In 1872, Baxter supported the Liberal Republican Party. He had aligned himself with the main Republican Party by 1876, however, when he supported Rutherford B. Hayes for president.

== Federal judgeship ==
Baxter was nominated by President Rutherford B. Hayes on December 6, 1877, to a seat on the United States Circuit Courts for the Sixth Circuit vacated by Judge Halmor Hull Emmons. He was confirmed by the United States Senate on December 13, 1877, and received his commission the same day. His service terminated on April 2, 1886, due to his death.

=== Notable cases ===
Many of Baxter's opinions involved railroads. In one case, Louisville & Nashville Railroad Company v. Railroad Commission of Tennessee (1884), Baxter ruled that a Tennessee state law empowering the state's railroad commission to control rates was vague and unconstitutional. In another, Dinsmore v. Louisville, Cincinnati and Lexington Railway Company (1880), he ruled that railroads were "quasi-public instrumentalities," and thus railroad companies could not refuse transportation to any company (in this case an express courier), so long as that company paid a reasonable rate.

In 1884, Baxter overturned an injunction issued by a lower court that prevented baseball pitcher Tony Mullane from playing for the Toledo Blue Stockings, since he had already signed with the St. Louis Maroons. Baxter argued that baseball matters were too insignificant to occupy the courts' time.

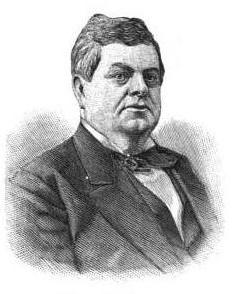
Sketch of Baxter, c. 1888

== Death ==
Baxter died on April 2, 1886, in Hot Springs, Arkansas. He was buried in Old Gray Cemetery in Knoxville.

== Family ==
Baxter's brother, Elisha Baxter, served as Governor of Arkansas from 1872 to 1874. His son, Lewis T. Baxter (1852–1927), was a prominent Nashville businessman and an unsuccessful candidate for Governor of Tennessee in 1890. Another son, George W. Baxter (1855–1929), briefly served as the territorial governor of Wyoming in 1886. Baxter was married four times: 1) Mahalah Hinds (m. 1836), Orra Alexander (m. 1843), Catherine Alexander (m. 1860) and Kate White (m. 1867).

Political offices
Preceded by James C. Dobbin	Speaker of the North Carolina House of Representatives; 1852–1854	Succeeded by Samuel P. Hill
Legal offices
Preceded by Halmor Hull Emmons	Judge of the United States Circuit Courts for the Sixth Circuit; 1877–1886	Succeeded by Howell Edmunds Jackson
