= Samuel G. Heiskell =

American politician (1858–1923)

- Born: August 7, 1858; Monroe County, Tennessee, U.S.
- Died: September 17, 1923 (aged 65); Knoxville, Tennessee, U.S.

Samuel Gordon Heiskell (August 7, 1858 – September 17, 1923) was an American lawyer, politician, and writer. He is best known for having been the mayor of Knoxville, Tennessee several times, and for having written about Andrew Jackson and the history of Tennessee.

== Biography ==
Heiskell was born on an East Tennessee farm and educated at the Universities of Tennessee and Virginia, working first as a lawyer In Alabama. He was elected mayor of Knoxville, Tennessee, United States for five terms, in office during the years 1896–98, 1900–02, 1906–08, 1910–15. He ran twice in Tennessee's 2nd congressional district as a Democrat but lost both elections. Heiskell was perceived as a progressive of the New South, who established "a public library, fought to keep liquor legal, banned spanking in city schools and used fines and nuisance laws to corral the city's prostitutes into the red-light district along Central Avenue and keep them out of 'respectable' neighborhoods. The mayor endorsed racial segregation but championed educational improvements for black and white students alike." Heiskell supported the establishment of several segregated social service programs for African-Americans in Knox County including a mental hospital, library, elementary schools, and a YMCA. In later life S. G. Heiskell wrote a biography of Andrew Jackson, his uncle Frederick S. Heiskell—having been founding editor of the Knoxville Register in 1816—was a longtime correspondent of Jackson.
