= John Netherland =

American attorney and politician (1808–1887)

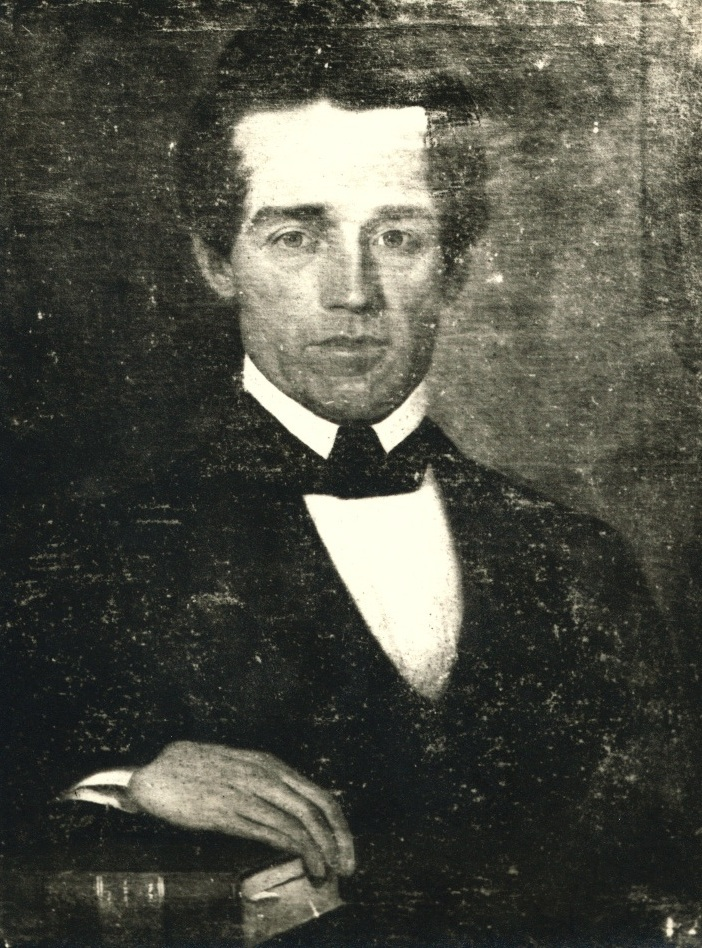
- Portrait of Netherland by Samuel Shaver (1846)

Member of the Tennessee Senate from the 1st district
- In office 1833–1835
- Preceded by: Abraham McClellan
- Succeeded by: Joseph Powell

Member of the Tennessee House of Representatives from Sullivan County
- In office 1835–1836
- Preceded by: George R. Powell
- Succeeded by: Elkanah Dulaney

Member of the Tennessee House of Representatives from Hawkins County
- In office 1851–1853
- Preceded by: Samuel Powell
- Succeeded by: James White

Personal details
- Born: September 20, 1808 Powhatan County, Virginia, United States
- Died: October 4, 1887 (aged 79) Rogersville, Tennessee
- Resting place: McKinney Cemetery; Rogersville, Tennessee
- Party: Whig
- Spouse: Susan McKinney (m. 1839)
- Profession: Attorney

John Netherland (September 20, 1808 – October 4, 1887) was an American attorney and politician, active primarily in mid-19th century Tennessee. A leader of the state's Whigs, he served in both the Tennessee Senate and Tennessee House of Representatives, and was an unsuccessful candidate for governor on the Opposition ticket in 1859. During the Civil War, he supported the Union, and was a delegate to the 1861 East Tennessee Convention.

== Early life and political career ==
Netherland was born in Powhatan County, Virginia, one of eleven children of Richard and Margaret (Woods) Netherland. While John was still an infant, the family moved to Kingsport, Tennessee, where his parents established a stagecoach stop known as the Netherland Inn. Young John was educated at Tusculum Academy under famed frontier preacher Samuel Doak, and read law with Judge Samuel Powell. He was admitted to the bar in 1829, and briefly moved to Franklin, Tennessee, before returning to Kingsport upon the death of his father.

Netherland was elected to the 1st district's seat in the state senate in 1833, when he was just 25 years old. As a state senator, he opposed the Indian removal policies of Andrew Jackson and state Democrats. In 1834, a state constitutional convention rewrote Tennessee's 1796 constitution. The new constitution placed the minimum age for state senators at 30, so he was unable to seek a second term. He did, however, win election to Sullivan County's seat in the Tennessee House of Representatives.

Netherland aligned himself with the burgeoning Whig Party, which generally opposed the policies of the Jackson administration. In 1836, he was an elector for Whig presidential candidate and fellow East Tennessean Hugh Lawson White. During his term in the state house, he opposed a bill that instructed the state's U.S. senators to vote for a measure reversing a censure of Jackson. This angered Sullivan Countians, and Netherland was subsequently forced to resign.

In 1837, Netherland moved to Rogersville, Tennessee, in nearby Hawkins County, where he would live for the rest of his life. In 1839, he married Susan McKinney, the daughter of powerful Rogersville attorney John A. McKinney. As a wedding present, McKinney built a house for the young couple, Rosemont, which still stands in downtown Rogersville.

While Netherland focused primarily on his law practice during the 1840s, he remained politically active. He ran unsuccessfully for the state legislature in 1841, losing by a narrow margin. In 1846, Netherland successfully defended a group of Melungeons who had been charged with illegally voting (colored people had been barred from voting by 1834 state constitution). In 1847, he was among the candidates considered by the state legislature to replace Spencer Jarnagin in the United States Senate, but the seat went to John Bell. Netherland was an at-large elector for Zachary Taylor in 1848, canvassing the state and debating Memphis judge William T. Brown and former governor Aaron V. Brown.

In 1851, Netherland was elected to the Hawkins County seat in the Tennessee House of Representatives. The following year, he supported Winfield Scott for president. In October 1852, Netherland was badly injured in a wagon accident while travelling to Calhoun, Tennessee, with Gustavus Henry and Charles McClung McGhee to stump for Scott.

== 1859 gubernatorial campaign ==
As the secession crisis arose in the late 1850s, Netherland, like many East Tennesseans, remained steadfastly loyal to the Union. To challenge pro-secession Southern Democrats, pro-Union leaders formed the Opposition Party, which supported slavery but rejected secession. In 1859, this party nominated Netherland to run for governor against the pro-secession incumbent, Isham G. Harris.

During the summer of 1859, Harris and Netherland engaged in a series of debates at campaign stops across the state. In spite of the growing sectional crisis, the key issue at most campaign stops was the Bank of Tennessee, which had become controversial following a series of bank failures in 1857. Harris, who had been bickering with the bank's president, Cave Johnson, opposed the bank. Netherland, arguing the bank provided money for the state's education fund, supported it. The issue of slavery occasionally came up, with Harris attempting to tie Netherland to the abolitionist motives of northern Republicans, and Netherland accusing Harris of sensationalizing the issue.

Historian Oliver Perry Temple, a fellow Whig and friend of Netherland, suggested that Netherland lacked intellectual curiosity and was not very well-read, and instead relied on his "exceptionally superior" common sense and "irresistible humor" when campaigning. Temple argued this trait hurt Netherland in the governor's race, as Harris came to every debate having studiously prepared to discuss every issue, and occasionally caught Netherland off guard. Recalling respective speeches the candidates gave at the Tennessee State Capitol in May, Randal McGavock, a friend of Harris, described Harris's speech as "able and dignified," while Netherland's speech was "filled with anecdotes and humorous sayings, but not very sound."

On election day, Harris defeated Netherland, winning 76,073 votes to Netherland's 68,042. With substantially higher voter turnout, Harris's margin of victory was 3,000 votes less than his victory over Robert H. Hatton in the 1857 governor's race. Democrats narrowly retained control of the state government, though the Opposition Party won seven of the state's ten congressional seats.

== Civil War ==
As Southern states considered secession following the election of Abraham Lincoln in late 1860 and early 1861, Netherland, along with Temple, William G. Brownlow, Horace Maynard, T. A. R. Nelson and Thomas D. Arnold, canvassed relentlessly to rally support for the Union. In February 1861, Netherland was Hawkins' pro-Union candidate for the proposed state convention to consider secession. While Tennessee voters rejected holding the convention, sentiments shifted in favor of secession following the Battle of Fort Sumter in April. A majority of East Tennesseans, however, remained pro-Union.

Netherland was a member of the Hawkins County delegation at the Greeneville session (June 17–20, 1861) of the East Tennessee Convention, which met a few days after the state voted to secede. Along with Temple and James McDowell, he was appointed to the committee that drafted a petition to the state legislature asking that East Tennessee be allowed to break away and form a separate, Union-aligned state. Netherland opposed a motion calling for the use of force if the legislature refused, and repeatedly stressed caution. "Our deliberations and acts will become historic," he said. "We should act calmly. We are in a revolution and a fearful one." Though the threat of force was removed from the final petition, the state legislature nevertheless rejected the convention's request, and Confederate forces occupied East Tennessee shortly afterward.

Netherland was not active during the war. His in-laws, the McKinneys, generally supported the Union, while many of his blood relatives supported the Confederacy (Sullivan County, where many of the Netherlands lived, was one of the few East Tennessee counties to vote in favor of secession). Netherland's son-in-law, Carrick Heiskell, served in the Confederate Army. In 1864, Netherland supported the Democratic presidential candidate, George B. McClellan, in his failed race against Lincoln.

== Later life ==
After the war, Netherland was appointed Minister to Bolivia by President Andrew Johnson, but he declined the appointment. Netherland was a delegate to the 1870 state constitutional convention, which created the present Tennessee state constitution. By the 1880s, his health had declined, forcing him to give up the practice of law.

Netherland died on October 4, 1887. When he died, he is said to have uttered, "old John's gone, and young John's gone, and Sarah's gone, and Molly's gone," referring to his son, wife, and daughter, who all preceded him in death. He was buried at the McKinney Cemetery in Rogersville.

John Netherland Heiskell, a grandson of Netherland, briefly represented Arkansas in the United States Senate in 1913.

== See also ==
- Frederick Heiskell
- William Heiskell
