= Lancaster Cemetery =

Historic cemetery in Garrard County, Kentucky, US

- U.S. National Register of Historic Places
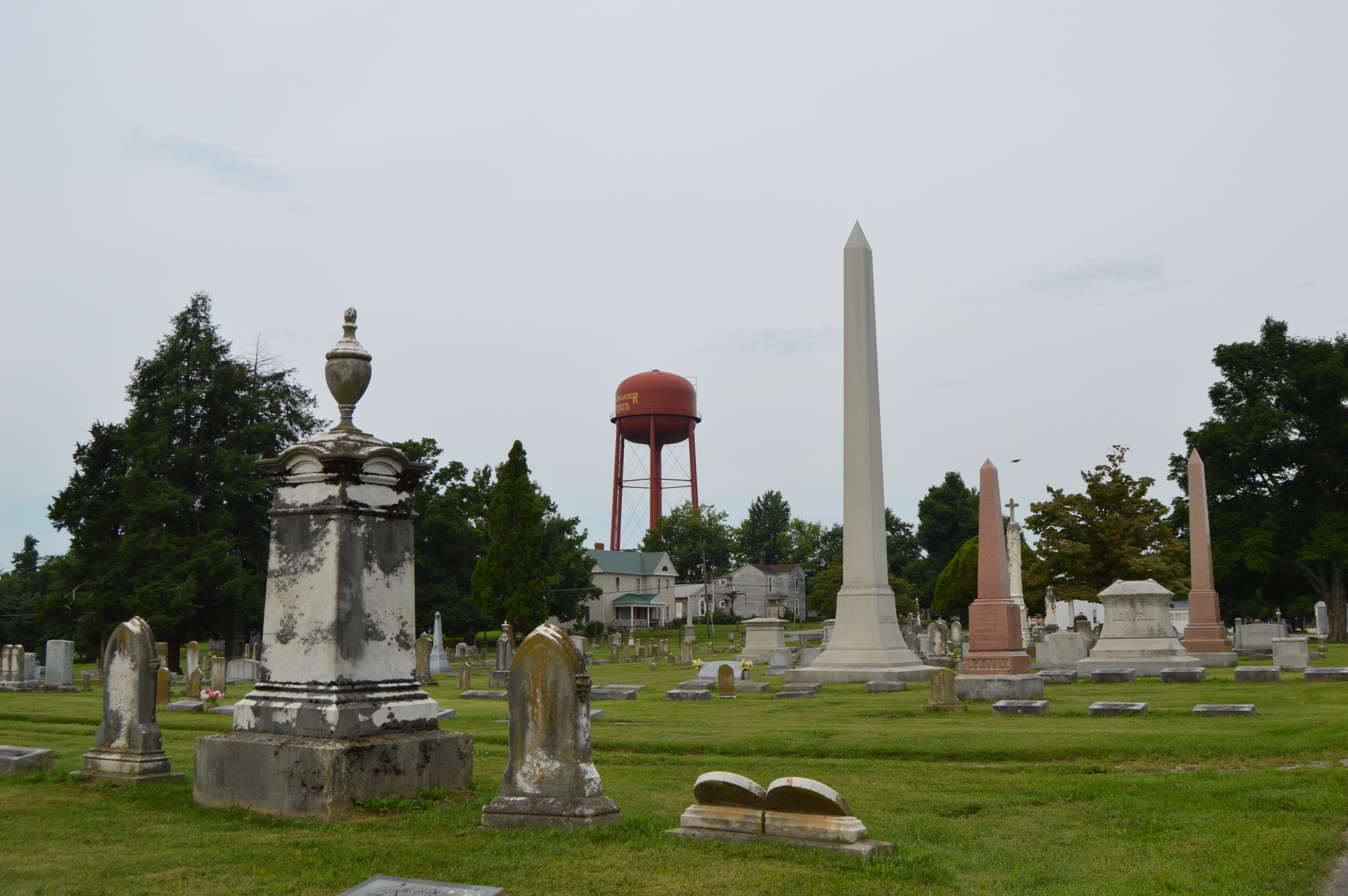

- Location within Kentucky Location within the United States
- Location: Campbell, Crab Orchard, and Richmond Sts., Lancaster, Kentucky
- Coordinates: 37°36′59″N 84°34′32″W
- Area: 5 acres (2.0 ha)
- Built: 1861
- Architectural style: Romanesque
- MPS: Lancaster MRA
- NRHP reference No.: 84001458
- Added to NRHP: March 26, 1984

The Lancaster, Kentucky Cemetery in Lancaster, Kentucky dates from 1861. It is enclosed by Campbell, Crab Orchard, and Richmond Streets in Lancaster. It was listed on the National Register of Historic Places in 1984. The listing included two contributing buildings and a contributing structure.

A sexton's house was built in 1866, using bricks from the former Old Republican Church which had been built in 1815. It has a stone receiving vault (1897) which was used to store bodies when grave digging was not possible. It has an original iron fence and stone entrance pillars, while entrance gates were recent (as of 1984) copies of original gates.

== Burials ==
Notable burials include:

- George W. Dunlap (1813–1880), US Representative
- William J. Landram (1828–1895), Civil War general
- George D. Scott (1850–1886), Indian Wars Medal of Honor recipient (cenotaph)
- Lewis L. Walker (1873–1944), US Representative
