= Joseph Brown Heiskell =

American politician (1823–1913)

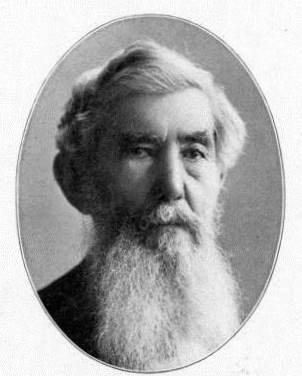

8th Attorney General of Tennessee
- In office 1870–1878
- Governor: DeWitt C. Senter; John C. Brown; James D. Porter
- Preceded by: Thomas H. Coldwell
- Succeeded by: Benjamin J. Lea

Member of the Confederate States House of Representatives from Tennessee's 1st district
- In office 1862–1864

Member of the Tennessee Senate for Hawkins, Hancock, and Jefferson
- In office 1857–1859
- Preceded by: B. F. McFarland
- Succeeded by: William M. Bradford

Personal details
- Born: November 5, 1823 Knoxville, Tennessee, U.S.
- Died: March 7, 1913 (aged 89) Memphis, Tennessee, U.S.
- Resting place: Elmwood Cemetery
- Party: Whig; Democratic
- Spouses: Sarah McKinney (m. 1846; died 1890); Lucy Watkins (m. 1891)
- Parent: Frederick Heiskell (father)

Joseph Brown Heiskell (November 5, 1823 – March 7, 1913) was a prominent Tennessee politician who served in the Confederate States Congress during the American Civil War.

== Biography ==
Heiskell was born in Knoxville, Tennessee, the son of newspaper publisher Frederick S. Heiskell (1786–1882) and Eliza (Brown) Heiskell. He served in the Tennessee State Senate during the 32nd General Assembly from 1857 to 1859, representing Hancock, Hawkins, and Jefferson counties as a member of the Whig Party.

Following the state's ordinance of secession and the outbreak of the Civil War, he represented Tennessee in the First Confederate Congress and the Second Confederate Congress from 1862 to 1864. After being captured by Union soldiers in 1864, Heiskell was incarcerated. He remained in prison until the end of the war.

Following his release, he established a practice in Memphis, Tennessee, and was active in local politics. He was Tennessee's attorney general from 1870 to 1878.

Heiskell died in Memphis on March 7, 1913. Interment was in the city's Elmwood Cemetery.

Heiskell was a nephew of William Heiskell, the post-Civil War Speaker of the Tennessee House of Representatives.

== Notes ==
Legal offices
Preceded by Thomas M. Coldwell	Attorney General of Tennessee; 1870–1878	Succeeded by Benjamin J. Lea
