= Samuel R. Rodgers =

American politician (1798–1866)

Speaker of the Tennessee Senate
- In office April 5, 1865 – June 10, 1865
- Preceded by: Burton L. Stovall
- Succeeded by: Joshua B. Frierson

United States Attorney for the Eastern District of Tennessee
- In office 1850–1853
- Preceded by: Thomas C. Lyon
- Succeeded by: J. Crozier Ramsey

Personal details
- Born: 1798 Greeneville, Tennessee, United States
- Died: July 16, 1866 (aged 67–68) Knoxville, Tennessee
- Resting place: Old Gray Cemetery; Knoxville, Tennessee
- Party: Whig Party; Republican Party
- Education: East Tennessee College
- Occupation: Attorney

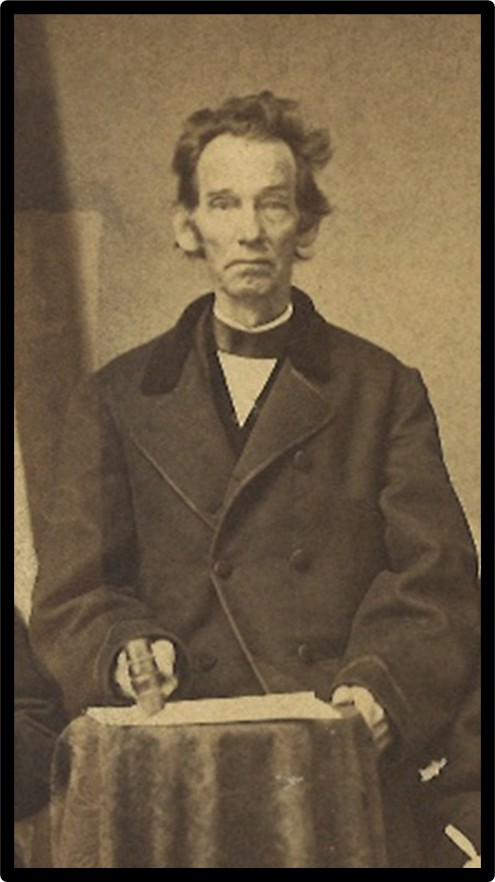
Samuel Ramsey Rogers in 1865 as President of the Liberty and Union Convention in Nashville, Tennessee

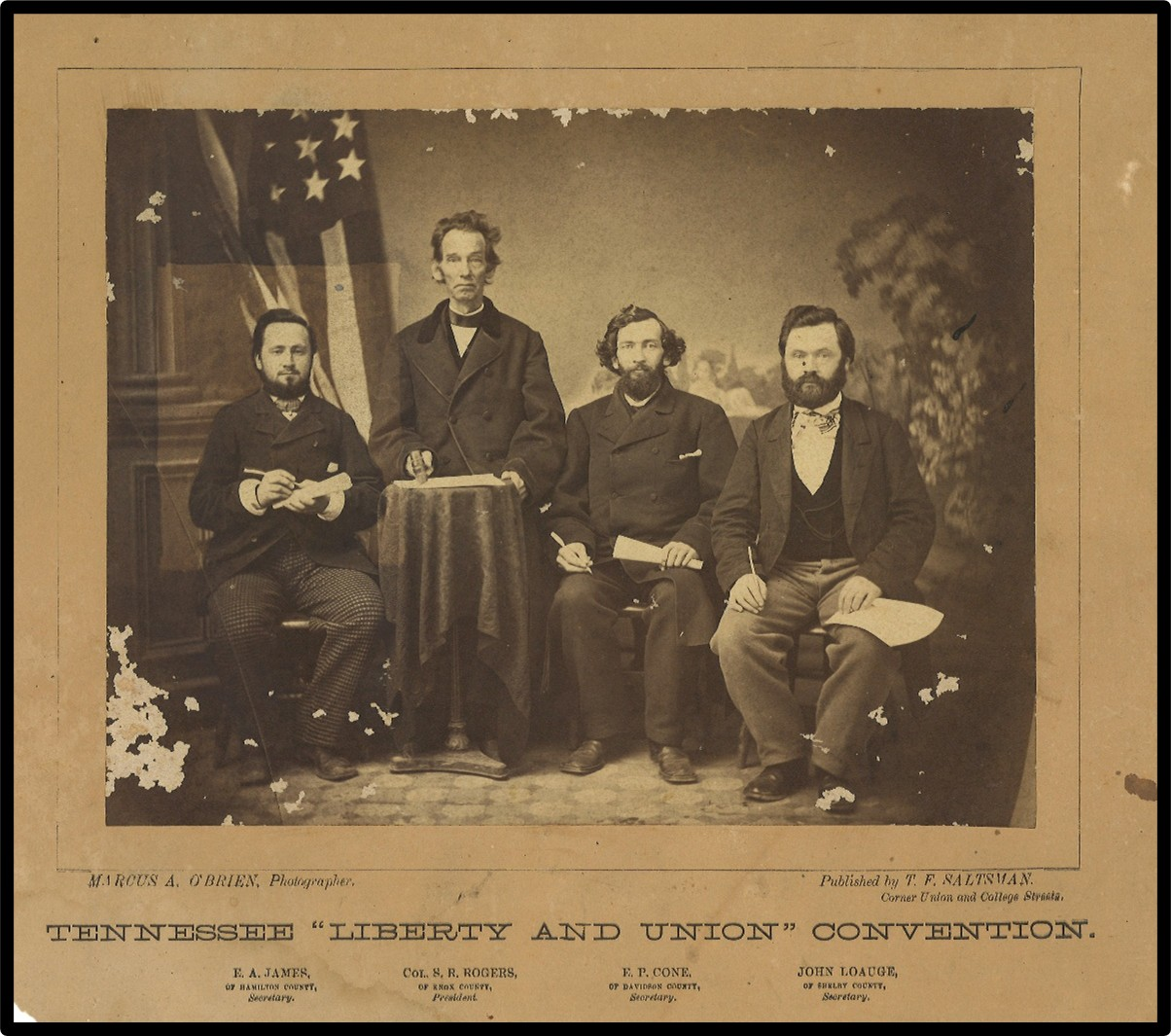
President Samuel R. Rodgers and Clerks of the Liberty and Union Convention, 1865.

Samuel Ramsey Rodgers (1798 – July 14, 1866) was an American attorney, judge and politician, who served as Speaker of the Tennessee Senate during the months following the Civil War. He oversaw the passage of several important pieces of legislation in the senate, including the state's ratification of the Thirteenth Amendment to the U.S. Constitution. Rodgers remained loyal to the Union during the war, and chaired the convention that reorganized the state government in January 1865.

Prior to the war, Rodgers served as U.S. Attorney for Tennessee's Eastern District (1850–1853), and taught at East Tennessee College (the forerunner of the University of Tennessee).

== Early life and career ==
Rodgers was born in Greeneville, Tennessee. According to the historian J. G. M. Ramsey, he was the son of James Rodgers, a farmer from Washington County who settled near the Ramsey House in Knox County in the early 1810s. Rodgers trained as a blacksmith before pursuing studies at East Tennessee College in Knoxville. After excelling as a student, he worked as an instructor at the college from 1826 to 1827. He studied law under Senator Hugh Lawson White, and was admitted to the bar in 1831.

During the Black Hawk War (1832), Rodgers served as a commissary colonel, and thus the title "Colonel" would subsequently be associated with his name. In 1834, Rodgers organized a petition calling for the gradual abolition of slavery, which he submitted to the state constitutional convention then in session. In 1849, President Zachary Taylor appointed Rodgers United States Attorney for the Eastern District of Tennessee. He served in this position until 1853.

In 1855, Rodgers ran as the American Party ("Know Nothing") candidate for the Tennessee Senate seat representing Knox and Roane counties, and defeated Democrat and popular Knoxville businessman Joseph A. Mabry in the general election. He served on the senate's judiciary, internal improvements, and public grounds committees. During his term, he obtained funding for the Tennessee School for the Deaf and Dumb in Knoxville, and generally supported state funding for railroad construction. He left the senate at the end of his term in 1857.

During the 1860 presidential election, Rodgers supported the Constitutional Union Party candidate John Bell, who sought to preserve the union by opposing both secession and abolition. In September 1860, Rodgers was one of five Bell supporters who confronted radical Alabama secessionist William Yancey during one of Yancey's campaign events in Knoxville. Rodgers was one of the more vocal Unionists at a citywide assembly held in Knoxville in late 1860 to discuss the secession issue.

In May 1861, Rodgers was among the Unionists who signed a call for the region's Union supporters to meet in Knoxville at what would become known as the East Tennessee Convention. He attended this convention as a member of the Knox County delegation.

== Speaker of the state senate ==
Rodgers presided over the January 1865 convention that reorganized Tennessee's state government. This convention nominated radical Knoxville newspaperman William "Parson" Brownlow for governor, suggested a slate of candidates (including Rodgers) for the state legislature, and proposed an amendment to the state constitution outlawing slavery. In the March 1865 elections scheduled by the convention, Rodgers was elected to the Tennessee Senate seat for the new fifth district, which consisted of Knox and Roane counties (his previous constituency).

When the state senate convened on April 5, Rodgers was elevated to speaker. In his acceptance speech, he stated the new senate's immediate purpose was to "restore this once proud, prosperous and happy state to its original place among the loyal States of the Union." He further proposed that the legislature take steps to ensure that the loyal people of Tennessee would never again be "governed by rebels." One of the senate's first actions was to ratify the Thirteenth Amendment to the U.S. Constitution, which outlawed slavery.

In May 1865, the state senate turned to a contentious piece of legislation known as the "Franchise Bill," which would bar former Confederates from voting. While the more radical members of the legislature, including Rodgers, vigorously supported the bill, some of the more moderate legislators (including Rodgers' House counterpart William Heiskell) opposed it. Speaking forcefully in favor of the bill, Rodgers stated that Rebels "had no right to live, much less to vote," and that it was "a piece of impudence for them to come here and ask the immunities of loyal citizens of America." In a subsequent speech, he stated that a truly repentant Rebel would ask only of Union leaders, "let me live in the country, I ask no part in the Government, I come back a hired servant." The bill eventually passed.

In early June 1865, Governor Brownlow appointed Rodgers chancellor (judge) of the state's eighth chancery district, which included Sevier, Blount, Monroe, McMinn, Roane, Knox, and Anderson counties. He resigned from the state senate on June 10, 1865, to take this position. He had also reportedly started suffering from the symptoms of tuberculosis, which may have contributed to his decision to leave the senate.

== Later life ==
In May 1866, Rodgers chaired a convention of East Tennessee Radicals who sought to form a separate state in East Tennessee, much like the East Tennessee Convention Rodgers had attended in 1861. The Radicals were frustrated with the failure of the state legislature to pass a second, more restrictive Franchise Bill (several legislators who were opposed to the bill had fled the capital several weeks earlier to prevent a quorum, leaving the bill in limbo). Shortly after the convention adjourned, however, the legislature passed the bill, and support for East Tennessee statehood collapsed.

There is no indication that Rodgers ever married or had children. Rodgers died from tuberculosis on July 16, 1866. He made his will before the Civil War ended, and left his enslaved people to his sisters Lucinda and Lavinia Rodgers, directing that they be emancipated when the sisters died. His brothers Thomas, John and William Rodgers dissented from the will. He is buried in Knoxville's Old Gray Cemetery. He was succeeded as chancellor by fellow attorney and Southern Unionist, Oliver Perry Temple.

== See also ==
- Alfred Cate
- Charles Inman
