= Knoxville Register =

1816–1864 American newspaper in Knoxville, Tennessee

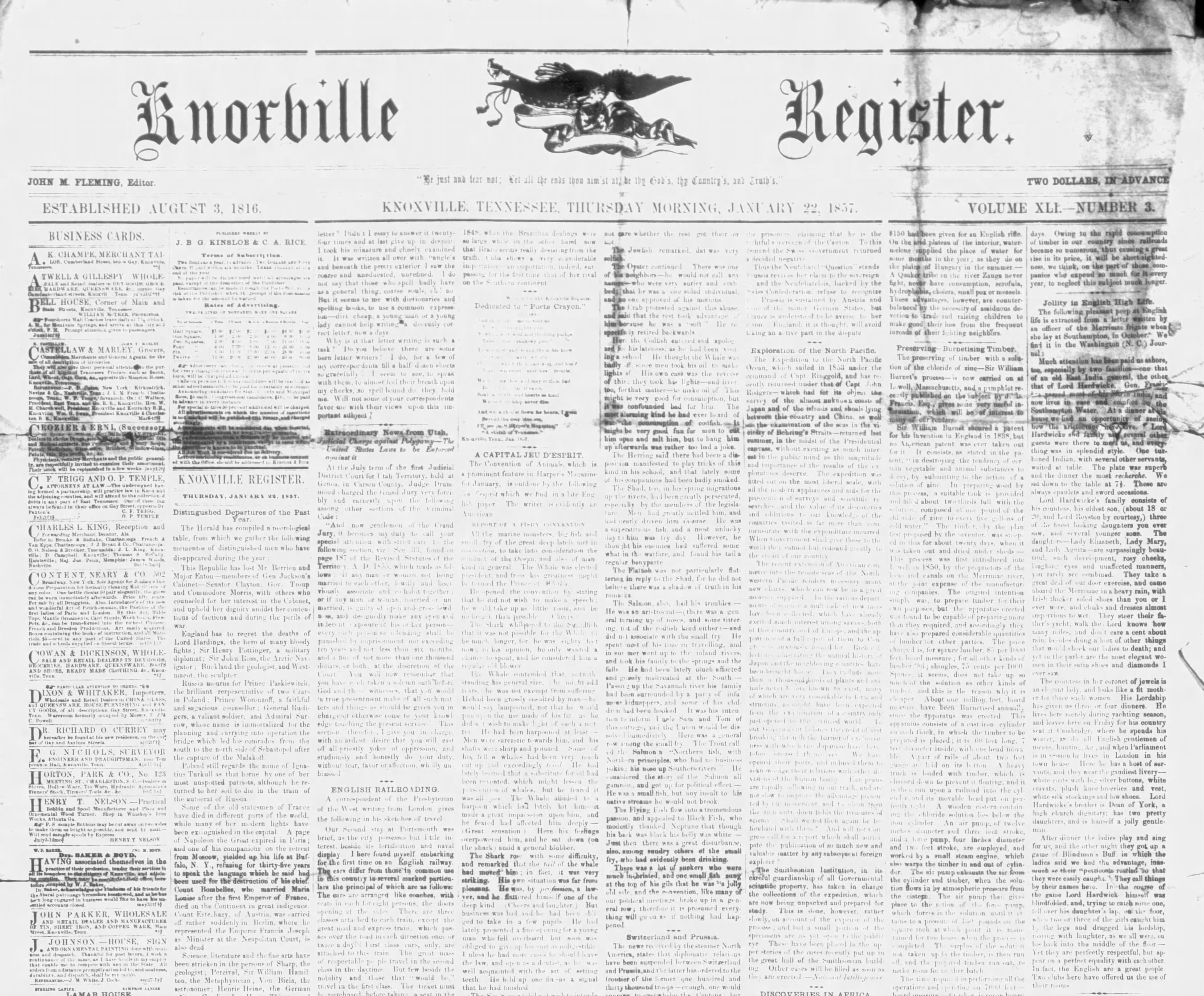
- Front page of the Register on January 22, 1857
- Type: Weekly (1816–1861); Daily (1861–1863)
- Format: Broadsheet
- Founder(s): Frederick S. Heiskell and Hugh L. Brown
- Publisher: Frederick S. Heiskell (1816–1837), Hugh L. Brown (1816–1829), W.B.A. Ramsey (1837–1839), Robert Craighead (1837–1839), James C. Moses (1839–1849), John L. Moses (1847–1849), John Miller McKee (1849–1855), J.B.L. Kinslow (1855–1857), C.A. Rice (1856–1857), J.F.J. Lewis (1859), George Bradfield (1859–1860), J. Austin Sperry (1861–1864)
- Editor: Hugh L. Brown (1816–1829), Frederick Heiskell (1816–1837), W.B.A. Ramsey (1835–1839), Thomas William Humes (1840), James C. Moses (1841–1849), John L. Moses (1847–1849), John Miller McKee(1849–1855), John M. Fleming(1855–1857), George Bradfield (1859–1861), J. Austin Sperry (1861–1864), William Malone (1864)
- Ceased publication: 1864
- Political alignment: Whig(1836–1859); Democratic (1859–1864)
- Language: English
- Headquarters: Knoxville, Tennessee (1816–1863); Atlanta, Georgia (1863); Bristol, Tennessee (1864)
- OCLC number: 11035625

The Knoxville Register was an American newspaper published primarily in Knoxville, Tennessee, during the 19th century. Founded in 1816, the paper was East Tennessee's dominant newspaper until 1863, when its pro-secession editor, Jacob Austin Sperry (1823–1896), was forced to flee advancing Union forces at the height of the Civil War. Sperry continued to sporadically publish the Register in Atlanta, and later Bristol, until he was finally captured by Union forces in December 1864.

Frederick S. Heiskell (1786–1882), who had worked briefly for Knoxville's first newspaper, the Knoxville Gazette, cofounded the Register along with his brother-in-law, Hugh Brown. The Register initially supported the policies of Andrew Jackson, but became a primarily Whig sheet in 1836, when it snubbed Jackson's handpicked presidential successor, Martin Van Buren, in favor of local favorite Hugh Lawson White. In 1849, polemical editor William G. Brownlow moved his paper, the Whig, to Knoxville, and a rivalry developed between the two papers that lasted until the Civil War.

== Publication ==
The Register was a broadsheet published weekly for its first four decades. In April 1861, largely in response to the growing interest in the secession crisis, a daily edition of the Register was established. Typical of 19th century broadsheets, the Register reported local news and published political editorials.

=== Titles ===
The Register is known to have been published under the following titles:

- Knoxville Register (1816–1839)
- Knoxville Register and Weekly Times (1839–1841)
- Knoxville Register (1841–1862)
- Knoxville Daily Register (1861–1862) — published daily
- The Daily Register (1862–1863)
- Knoxville and Atlanta Daily Register (1864)
- Knoxville Register (1864)

== History ==
=== Early publication ===
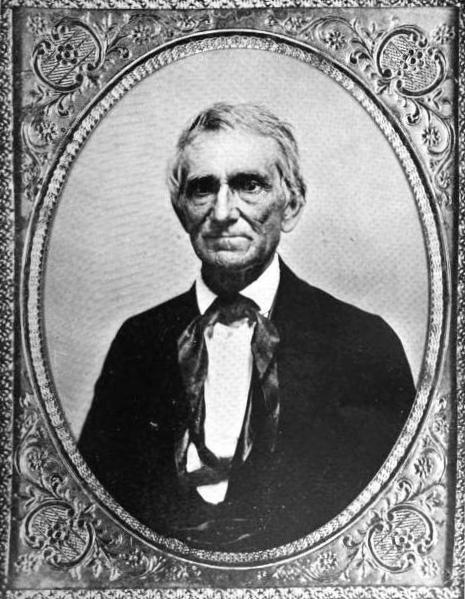
Frederick Heiskell

Frederick Heiskell moved to Knoxville from Virginia in late 1814, and worked as a journeyman printer at the Gazette, Knoxville's oldest paper, for just over a year, before leaving to form his own newspaper. On August 3, 1816, he and Hugh L. Brown, whose sister Heiskell had married a few weeks earlier, published the first issue of the Register. When the Gazette closed and its owner moved to Nashville in 1818, the Register became Knoxville's only newspaper.

For a newspaper published in an obscure frontier town, the Register was relatively progressive in its early days. Heiskell and Brown supported the abolition of slavery and advocated religious tolerance. Between 1818 and 1820, they simultaneously published one of the nation's earliest abolitionist newsletters, the Western Monitor and Religious Observer. In 1820, the Register mourned the death of noted Jonesborough abolitionist, Elihu Embree. Heiskell and Brown also published numerous pamphlets and state documents. In 1823, they published John Haywood's Civil and Political History of Tennessee, one of the first comprehensive histories of the state.

By the late 1820s, the Register had positioned itself as one of the state's most influential newspapers, mostly through its support of President Andrew Jackson. The paper consistently called for internal improvements, especially regarding roads, railroads, and postal service. In 1826, the paper rallied support for East Tennessee College's move to Barbara Hill, just west of Knoxville, and the following year helped revive interest in the Knoxville Female Academy. Although Brown left in 1829, future Confederate general Felix Zollicoffer joined the paper as a journeyman printer in 1831, and future Knoxville mayor W.B.A. Ramsey joined as an editor in 1835.

=== The Whig period (1836–1859) ===
During the presidential election of 1836, the Register abandoned Jackson when it supported Whig candidate Hugh Lawson White instead of Jackson's choice, Martin Van Buren. In 1837, Heiskell retired and sold the paper to Ramsey and Robert Craighead. Ramsey and Craighead made several changes that angered subscribers, prompting local businessman Perez Dickinson and Exeter, New Hampshire-born editor James C. Moses to establish a rival paper, the Times, with Thomas William Humes as editor. In 1839, Moses bought the Register and merged the two papers. Humes edited the merged paper until 1840, after which Moses edited the paper himself.

In 1849, attorneys William G. Swan and John Hervey Crozier formed a syndicate which purchased the Register, and installed John Miller McKee as editor. That same year, William G. "Parson" Brownlow, already well known in Knoxville as publisher of the Whig, moved his paper from Jonesborough to Knoxville. Brownlow accused the owners of the Register of trying to prevent his move to the city, namely by trying to deny him advertisers, and initiated a barrage of attacks against the paper, its owners, and McKee. McKee initially brushed off Brownlow's attacks, but as they intensified, he finally began responding, touching off a lengthy editorial quarrel.

Throughout the early 1850s, the Register struggled financially as the prices of paper and printing supplies continued to rise. In 1855, the cash-strapped paper was sold to the Kinslow Brothers, who installed a Brownlow ally, John M. Fleming, as editor, briefly ending its quarrel with the Whig. In 1859, however, slavery advocate George Bradfield purchased the Register, and converted it into a pro-secession paper, again bringing the paper into conflict with the pro-Union Whig. After the election of Abraham Lincoln in November 1860, Bradfield called for immediate secession, claiming, "the last link is broken."

=== Secession crisis ===
As the secession debate intensified in the weeks following Lincoln's election, Knoxville's disunionists grew increasingly concerned over the influence wielded by Brownlow, whom they believed responsible for East Tennessee's relatively strong Union sentiment. To counter Brownlow, a group of Knoxville secessionists purchased the Register in early 1861, and installed radical secessionist Jacob Austin Sperry as editor. Sperry immediately set out to attack Brownlow and other Union leaders, carefully tailoring his arguments to show how the demise of slavery would harm not just planters from the Deep South, but poor whites of East Tennessee as well.

Brownlow dismissed Sperry's attacks, calling him a "tool" who "fathers the slang prepared for him by men too cowardly to write over their own signatures." After the attack on Fort Sumter in April 1861, Sperry began publishing a daily edition of the Register. Secession leaders Crozier, William H. Sneed, and J. G. M. Ramsey wrote editorials for the paper, and Sperry insisted that East Tennessee's Unionists would eventually come around and unite with the region's secessionists.

=== Civil War ===
Throughout the latter half of 1861, the Register called for harsh measures against the region's Unionists, and demanded they either take Oath of Allegiance to the Confederacy or be jailed for the duration of the coming war. Ironically, the paper's cofounder, Frederick Heiskell, then in his late 70s, was among the Unionists jailed for refusing to take the Oath. General Felix Zollicoffer, a former employee of the Register, commanded Confederate forces occupying East Tennessee in late 1861.

After Brownlow was arrested in December 1861, the Register demanded he either be hanged or jailed. When Confederate authorities ordered his release, the Register blasted the decision as foolish, stating "that Brownlow is now laughing, like the king's fool, in his sleeve, we doubt not for a moment." In February 1862, the Register issued a call for the formation of a Knoxville home-guard to help defend against a Union invasion, and supported the continued application of martial law in the region to root out Union loyalists.

As Union support in East Tennessee remained steady, Sperry grew increasingly frustrated. He complained that many county officials in East Tennessee who had taken the Oath still supported the Union, or otherwise refused to help the Confederate cause. While Unionism had "played out," Sperry wrote in January 1863, its "bastard and malignant offspring, neutrality, has succeeded it." Sperry slammed Lincoln's Emancipation Proclamation, and happily published a letter from prominent Unionist T.A.R. Nelson suggesting that East Tennessee Unionists had been deceived.

=== Demise ===
When General Ambrose Burnside's Union forces entered Knoxville in September 1863, Sperry was forced to suspend publication of the Register and flee south. He briefly revived the paper in Atlanta, but advancing Union forces again forced him to flee. Sperry finally settled in Bristol, Tennessee, in 1864, and attempted to again revive the Register, boasting that the paper was "once again published on East Tennessee soil." Finally, in December 1864, Bristol fell to Union forces, and Sperry and several other Confederate leaders were captured and marched back to Knoxville.

In Knoxville, Sperry was shackled to a ball-and-chain, and forced to work on the city's fortifications. Many of the city's Unionist leaders found this treatment too harsh and degrading, the exception being Brownlow, who demanded Sperry and other secessionists be hanged for treason. Sperry was eventually tried for slandering East Tennessee's Unionists, but acquitted.

In the 1870s, Knoxville's Democrats launched a new newspaper, the Tribune, which they considered a successor to the Register. Throughout the 1880s, the Tribune bickered with the city's Republican paper, the Chronicle, founded by William Rule as a successor to the Whig.
