= Opposition Party (Southern U.S.) =

U.S. Southern pro-slavery party of the 1850s

- Leaders: John Adams Gilmer; John Netherland
- Founded: 1858; 168 years ago
- Dissolved: 1860; 166 years ago
- Preceded by: Whig Party; Union Party
- Merged into: Constitutional Union Party
- Ideology: Pro-slavery; Southern Unionism; Whiggism
- Colors: Yellow

The Opposition Party was a third party in the South in the years just before the American Civil War.

== Confusing labels ==
The late 1850s saw political chaos during the fragmenting of the Second Party System of Jackson Democrats and Clay Whigs. The Democratic efforts to expand slavery into Western territories, particularly Kansas, led to organized political opposition, which coalesced in Congress as the Opposition Party.

As the Whig Party disintegrated, many local and regional parties grew up, some ideological, some geographic. When they realized their numbers in Congress, they began to caucus in the same way American political parties had arisen before the Jacksonian national party conventions. Scholars such as Kenneth C. Martis have adopted a convention to explain the Congressional coordination of anti-Pierce and anti-Buchanan factions as the Opposition Party. The Opposition Party as a third party in the South was made up of political activists who organized, held party conventions and elected members to Congress.

The "Opposition Party" name was adopted by several former Whig politicians in the period 1854–1858. In 1860, the party was encouraged by the remaining Whig leadership to effectively merge with the Constitutional Union Party. The party was seen as offering a compromise position between the Southern Democrats and Northern Republicans.

The Whig name had been discredited and abandoned, but former Whigs still needed to advertise that they were opposed to the Democrats. The Know Nothings had found that their faction's appeals to anti-immigrant prejudice were faltering and their secrecy was made suspect, so they sought more open and more inclusive appeals to broaden a candidate's chances at the polls.

The "confounding party labels among all those who opposed the Democrats" have led to scholars of American political parties in Congress to adopt the convention "Opposition Party" for the 34th and 35th Congresses. This term encompasses anti-Democratic, anti-Know Nothing members elected in the 1854-55 United States House of Representatives elections.

To qualify as a third party by Kenneth C. Martis' analysis, a political party must meet one of four criteria, including (a) run clearly identifiable congressional candidates, many times in three-way contests; and/or (b) they represent a clearly identifiable historical political movement or sentiment that is regional or national in scope. Elements of the pro-Union American Party and the Whig Party in the South needed to organize a political party which could not be accused of disloyalty to Southern institutions (i.e. slavery).

== The elections of 1858 ==
In 1858, 19 candidates were elected to the 36th United States Congress as members of the Opposition Party from several states, including Kentucky, North Carolina, Tennessee and Virginia.

After 1858, the party did not win seats in Congress and effectively ceased to exist.

In March 1859, the Opposition Party held its Tennessee convention to nominate a gubernatorial candidate (John Netherland) and set up a statewide party organization. It won seven of the nine Congressional districts (see chart below). Kentucky followed in February 1859, winning five of the ten districts. Georgia's election was in July 1859, winning two of eight districts. In North Carolina, the anti-Democratic parties won four of the eight seats and caucused with the Opposition party in the House.

These elections were the last gasp in the South to stand up to the Democrats in the emerging sharp sectional confrontation.

Opposition Party in the 36th Congress, 1859–1861
State	Georgia	Kentucky	North Carolina	Tennessee	Virginia
Representative, (Congressional District Number)
1.	Thomas Hardeman Jr. (3rd)	Francis M. Bristow (3rd)	William N. H. Smith (1st)	Thomas A.R. Nelson (1st)	Alexander R. Boteler (8th)
2.	Joshua Hill (7th)	William C. Anderson (4th)	John A. Gilmer (5th)	Horace Maynard (2nd)	...
3.	...	Green Adams (6th)	James Madison Leach (6th)	Reese B. Brabson (3rd)	...
4.	...	Robert Mallory (7th)	Zebulon B. Vance (8th)	William B. Stokes (4th)	...
5.	...	Laban T. Moore (9th)	...	Robert H. Hatton (5th)	...
6.	...	...	...	James M. Quarles (8th)	...
7.	...	...	...	Emerson Etheridge (9th)	...

== Later activity in North Carolina ==
In North Carolina, a Republican organization did not develop until after the Civil War and many former Whigs such as John Pool called themselves either the Whig Party or the Opposition Party through the election of 1860. This "new" Whig Party was actually just the state's affiliate of the American (Know Nothing) Party with a new name, according to Folk and Shaw's W.W. Holden: a Political Biography.

This party ceased to exist after the onset of the Civil War, but many of its members joined the loosely organized Conservative Party of Zebulon B. Vance.

== See also ==
- Category:Opposition Party (United States) politicians
- Opposition Party (Illinois)
- Opposition Party (Northern U.S.)
