= John N. Heiskell =

American politician

John Netherland Heiskell
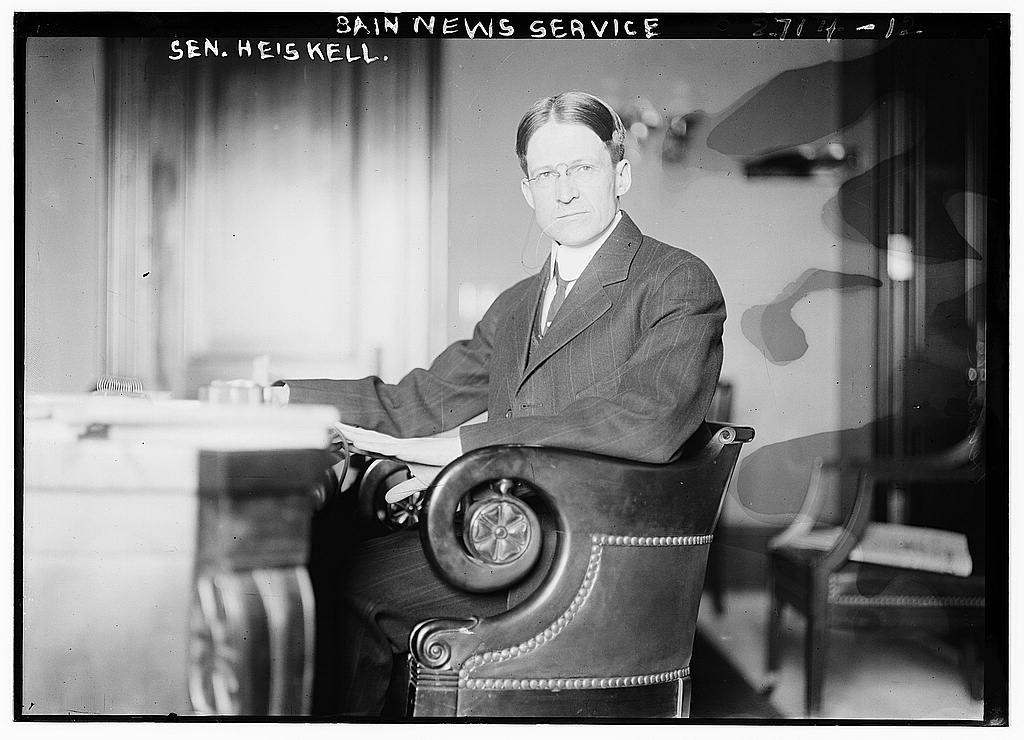

United States Senator from Arkansas
- In office January 6, 1913 – January 29, 1913
- Appointed by: George Washington Donaghey
- Preceded by: Jeff Davis
- Succeeded by: William M. Kavanaugh

Personal details
- Born: November 2, 1872 Rogersville, Tennessee
- Died: December 28, 1972 (aged 100) Little Rock, Arkansas
- Resting place: Mount Holly Cemetery, Little Rock, Arkansas
- Party: Democratic
- Spouse: Wilhelmina Mann
- Relations: John Netherland (grandfather); Frederick Heiskell (grandfather); George R. Mann (father-in-law); Whitfield Cook (son-in-law)
- Children: 4
- Education: University of Tennessee
- Profession: Newspaper editor

John Netherland Heiskell (November 2, 1872 – December 28, 1972) was a prominent American newspaper editor who served briefly in the United States Senate after being appointed to fill a vacancy. He was the editor of the Arkansas Gazette from 1902 until his death, and served in the United States Senate from Arkansas briefly in 1913. As the result of his long life, Heiskell attained several Senate longevity records, and was the second U.S. Senator to reach the age of 100.

== Early life ==
Heiskell was born in Rogersville, Tennessee on November 2, 1872, the son of Carrick White Heiskell and Eliza (Netherland) Heiskell. He was educated at public and private schools in the Knoxville area, and graduated from the University of Tennessee in 1893.

== Start of career ==
Heiskell's family had been involved in newspaper publishing and editing for several generations, and Heiskell also pursued a career in journalism. He worked as a reporter for newspapers in Knoxville and Memphis, and reported for the Associated Press in Chicago and Louisville. In 1902, the Heiskell family bought a controlling interest in the Arkansas Gazette, and Heiskell became the editor, with his brother Fred taking the position of managing editor.

The Gazette became known for issues-oriented reporting, and Heiskell used it as a platform to advocate for civic and charitable causes. In 1907, he published several editorials calling for construction of a public library in Little Rock. His advocacy was successful, and when the library opened, Heiskell received its first library card and an appointment to the board of directors, on which he served until his death. Heiskell's activism also included service on the state Civil Service Commission and Planning Board and the Pulaski County Planning Board.

Under the leadership of the Heiskell brothers, their newspaper's circulation nearly doubled in four years. As part of their issues-oriented approach, they remained neutral in Democratic primary contests (then tantamount to election in most of the South) and supported Democratic candidates against Republicans in general elections. An exception was Heiskell's long-term editorial page feud with Governor Jeff Davis, in which Heskiell criticized Davis' record in office, and Davis accused Heskiell of operating a newspaper financed by and beholden to outsiders.

== United States Senator ==
On January 3, 1913, Jeff Davis, who had been elected to the U.S. Senate in 1907, died in office. On January 6, Governor George Washington Donaghey appointed Heiskell to temporarily fill the vacancy until the Arkansas General Assembly could meet to choose a successor. On January 29, the Assembly chose William Marmaduke Kavanaugh to complete Davis' term, which was scheduled to end on March 3. The legislature also chose Governor Joseph Taylor Robinson for the full six year Senate term that began on March 4, 1913.

As a result of this political maneuvering, Heiskell served as a Senator for 23 days, which remains one of the shortest period of service ever in the U.S. Senate.

== Later career ==
Heiskell continued to serve as editor of the Gazette, and produced editorials on a wide variety of issues. He advocated for city planning and for the commission form of municipal government. He opposed the Little Rock School Board's decision to drop German language classes during World War I, and opposed anti-Semitism, though he favored limits on immigration so that recent arrivals could be more easily assimilated. His was also a supporter of Prohibition and women's suffrage, while continuing to advocate for traditional cultural morality. On the issue of race relations, Heskiell's editorials supported segregation with the argument that "separate but equal" was legal and would cause the least conflict. Despite this paternalistic attitude, Heskiell was also an opponent of lynching and called for a grand jury investigation into the Little Rock mob violence that led to John Carter's lynching in 1927.

As an avid student of Arkansas history and collector mementos and ephemera, Heskiell created an archive and library which was stored at the Gazette offices, and the Gazette was believed to be the country's only newspaper that employed a full-time staff historian. In 1947, Heskiell selected Harry S. Ashmore to succeed him as executive editor, though Heskiell continued as editor and maintained an active interest in the Gazette's management. When the 1957 desegregation of Little Rock's Central High School became a contentious issue, Heiskell supported Ashmore's advocacy for obedience to the federal courts. Ashmore's editorials and the Gazette's news coverage of the events surrounding the school's desegregation resulted in the award of two Pulitzer Prizes.

== Death and burial ==
He died in Little Rock on December 28, 1972. He was buried at Mount Holly Cemetery in Little Rock.

== Legacy ==
In 1958, Heiskell received the Elijah Parish Lovejoy Award and the honorary degree of LL.D. degree from Colby College. In addition, he received honorary degrees from Syracuse University, Columbia University, and the University of Missouri. In addition, he received the John Peter Zenger Award and an honorary degree from the University of Arizona.

Despite his short time in the Senate, Heiskell's long life made him the oldest living former Senator from 1966 until his death. He was the last Senator to have served in the 1910s and during the presidencies of William Howard Taft and Woodrow Wilson.

== Family ==
On June 28, 1910, Heiskell married Wilhelmina Mann, the daughter of George R. Mann, a nationally prominent architect. Their children included Elizabeth (1912-1974), Louise (1921-1990), John Jr. (b. 1914), and Carrick (1917-1943). Elizabeth Keiskell was the wife of screenwriter Whitfield Cook. Louise was the wife of Hugh B. Patterson, the longtime business manager and later publisher of the Arkansas Gazette. Their Son, Carrick, served as editor until the paper was sold to Gannett. John Jr. died reaching adulthood. Carrick died in an airplane crash while serving in World War II.

Heiskell was a grandson of two prominent Tennessee politicians, John Netherland and Frederick Heiskell.

U.S. Senate
Preceded by Jeff Davis	U.S. senator (Class 2) from Arkansas; January 6, 1913–January 29, 1913; Served alongside: James Clarke	Succeeded by William M. Kavanaugh
Honorary titles
Preceded by Henry Ashurst	Most senior living U.S. senator (Sitting or former); May 31, 1962 – December 28, 1972	Succeeded by Burton K. Wheeler and Clarence Dill
Preceded by Theodore Green	Oldest living U.S. senator May 19, 1966 – December 28, 1972	Succeeded by George Radcliffe
