= Cumberland Estates =

Neighborhood in Knoxville, Tennessee

- Neighborhood
- NBC's The House That HOME Built (4116 Royalview Road), built in 1957

- Location in the State of Tennessee

- Location in the United States
- Coordinates: 35°59′02″N 84°00′45″W
- Country: United States
- State: Tennessee
- County: Knox
- City: Knoxville
- Developed: 1955-1965
- Developer: Bradley Dean
- Architect: Bruce McCarty, and others
- Architectural style: Mid-century Modern
- Time zone: UTC−05:00 (EST)
  - Summer (DST): UTC−04:00 (EDT)
- Area code: 865
- Zip Code: 37921

Cumberland Estates is a residential neighborhood in the City of Knoxville, Tennessee, United States, which gained national attention for architectural innovation and research housing in the mid-20th century. It began 2.1 miles outside the city limits, in Knox County, as one of many planned suburban neighborhoods in the post-World War II economic expansion. The development soon attracted an innovative young architect and national sponsors who would create new ways to rapidly and affordably fill the demand for residential housing needs for America’s growing population of families. Their prominent work in the neighborhood influenced the evolution of residential building design. While the attention received from the research homes waned in the last century, the neighborhood has maintained its residential character with few changes while avoiding commercial encroachment and blight.

== Location ==
It is located seven miles northwest of downtown Knoxville and lies in the eastern portion of Tennessee in the foothills of the Appalachian Mountains. The neighborhood is bordered to the east by Victor Ashe Park and West Haven, to the north by Norwood, to the west by Karns, and to the south by West Hills. Third Creek runs through the neighborhood before emptying into the Tennessee River at the University of Tennessee. The City of Oak Ridge is 14 miles to the west on State Route 62, known locally as Oak Ridge Highway, where many of the neighborhood's first residents worked in the national facilities succeeding the Manhattan Project.

== Post-war development ==
Cumberland Estates was developed by Bradley Dean in 16 sections during a period of 10 years with the first section recorded at the Knox County Register of Deeds on November 7, 1955, by Dean, President of East Tennessee Development Co., and the final section recorded November 23, 1965, by Dean, at this time president of Dean & Company Inc. The 16 sections were all titled “Cumberland Estates.” The first 13 sections were developed on the north side of Oak Ridge Highway, while the final three were developed south of Oak Ridge Highway. The 16 sections - numbered 1 through 17 while skipping number 13 - each have a Declaration of Restrictions, governing 16 detailed points such as setbacks, minimum square footage, and other building restrictions common to planned suburban neighborhoods.

The development began along Sullivan Road, and was followed with the creation of some 25 miles of new streets. One of these, Palmetto, connects Sullivan Road to Oak Ridge Highway, which, on the plats filed at the Knoxville City-County Building, is often referred to as “Solway Road” or “Solway Highway to Oak Ridge.”

Near its completion, Dean was named the 1965 Tennessee Home Builder of the Year, and in 1966 he became president of the Home Builders Association of Greater Knoxville.

== Feature television and research housing ==
Two of the homes influenced the post-World War II architectural trends and construction methods. They were designed by architect Bruce McCarty, whose designs represented the most advanced modernist theories applying manufacturing technology to housing design and received national attention and promotions by the National Broadcasting Company and the National Association of Homebuilders.

=== The House That HOME Built ===
In 1957, the producers of the NBC television show HOME commissioned McCarty to design a home which would introduce homemakers to the latest in design. The morning magazine show sponsored innovative house projects in a feature titled “The House That HOME Built.” McCarty and his wife, Elizabeth, appeared on the program with its host, Arlene Francis, and co-host, Hugh Downs, in its New York studio to discuss this particular house design as well as housing needs expressed by young families.

The house was based on the planning principles agreed to by the 1956 Women’s Congress on Housing, organized by the U.S. Housing and Home Finance Agency. The promotion captured the attention and cooperation of the home builders in the area in a unique venture. The members of the Home Builders Association of Greater Knoxville agreed in July 1957 that all the builders participating in the 1957 Parade of Homes should combine efforts in building the McCarty-designed home. It was the first such cooperative venture ever initiated.

The house, built at 4116 Royalview Road, was originally owned by Martin L. Bartling Jr, a creative home builder whose houses became nationally recognized. He was president of the National Association of Home Builders in the late 1960s.

The first family to live in the house was Loyd and Frances Wilson and their sons, Jeff and Eric, from 1957 to 1964.

One of the last remaining original home owners still living in Cumberland Estates died in December 2018. Ms. Dolores and her husband James (d. 2000) were the first and only owners of their home on Robindale Drive (an 1800 square foot three-bedroom basement rancher), which they purchased in 1962 for approximately $18,000, on the north side of Cumberland Estates.

=== 1959 NAHB research house ===
As the post-war high demand for housing created the need for a more affordable and swifter type of construction, the National Association of Home Builders commissioned McCarty to design a research house in 1959. It was titled “A house for you from America’s homebuilding industry” and was built at 4409 Crestfield Road.

McCarty’s concentration was in breaking down all of the building elements into modular parts that could be prefabricated and organized into well-planned medium-cost housing. These elements included wall panels, closet hardware, kitchen-bathroom cores, and window units. The wall construction design was an interlocking prefabricated wall-panel system consisting of a pre-finished interior skin, electrical wiring and insulation, with the modular panels made by the builder off site which could then all be snapped into place at one time. It was considered one of the most adaptable ideas from the research house.

Innovative utility-saving features included an electronic toilet using one gallon of water per flush as compared to the usual five, faucet controls reducing water consumption, and full-height room doors eliminating high wall areas that prevent recirculation of central heat and air at ceiling level. Every interior and exterior detail was designed for efficiency and reducing costs, including decorative details which were designed as structural components.

== Home styles ==
Houses in Cumberland Estates consist primarily of ranch, basement ranch and split-level homes positioned in the neighborhood hills typical of East Tennessee topography. Home designs are largely consistent with the mid-century modern design movement. McCarty’s residential designs were influenced by architect Frank Lloyd Wright. House sizes generally range between 1,000 and 2,000 square feet, with lots in size from approximately 1/4 acre to 1/2 acre.

== Recreation and parks ==
Dean included three swimming pools in the development and set aside a 26-acre wooded lot for the creation of the Cumberland Estates Recreation Center, a city-owned facility with meeting rooms, gym, dance studio, outdoor playground and nature trails. It is commonly used for children and senior activities and neighborhood and community meetings.

Bordering Cumberland Estates to the east lies Victor Ashe Park, a 120 acre city park of recreational fields, greenway, dog parks, disc golf, restrooms, playground, and a pond. The neighborhood and park are connected by Third Creek, which Dean partially relocated in 1960 to develop section seven between Sullivan and Deerfield Roads.

== City annexation ==
The Cumberland Estates development began 2.1 miles from the city limits. Before it was completed, the Knoxville City Council voted to annex it, as well as other suburban neighborhoods, on Tuesday November 22, 1960, increasing the city’s population by an estimated 70,000 to 181,000, and increasing the overall area of the city from 26.5 square miles to 81 square miles.

The reported population of Cumberland Estates at the time of annexation was 3,050 in 919 dwelling units, and the still developing neighborhood encompassed 3.5 square miles, or approximately 2,240 acres, with 25 miles of streets.

In preparation for the annexation, Knoxville Fire Department Chief Roy Conner announced a proposed new fire station to be located at Oak Ridge Highway and Third Creek.

City Council voted in January 1980 to change the name of Oak Ridge Highway to Western Avenue from Pleasant Ridge Road out to the city limits, becoming the first street name change within the neighborhood.

To maintain a residential flavor along Western Avenue, the Metropolitan Planning Commission adopted a land use plan in 1970 recommending future commercial activity along the highway to be limited to community shopping facilities within and around the Cumberland Estates Shopping Center and single occupant commercial offices along the highway between Ball Camp Pike and Hinton Road.
