= Fidelity Building (Knoxville) =

- Cowan, McClung and Company Building
- U.S. National Register of Historic Places
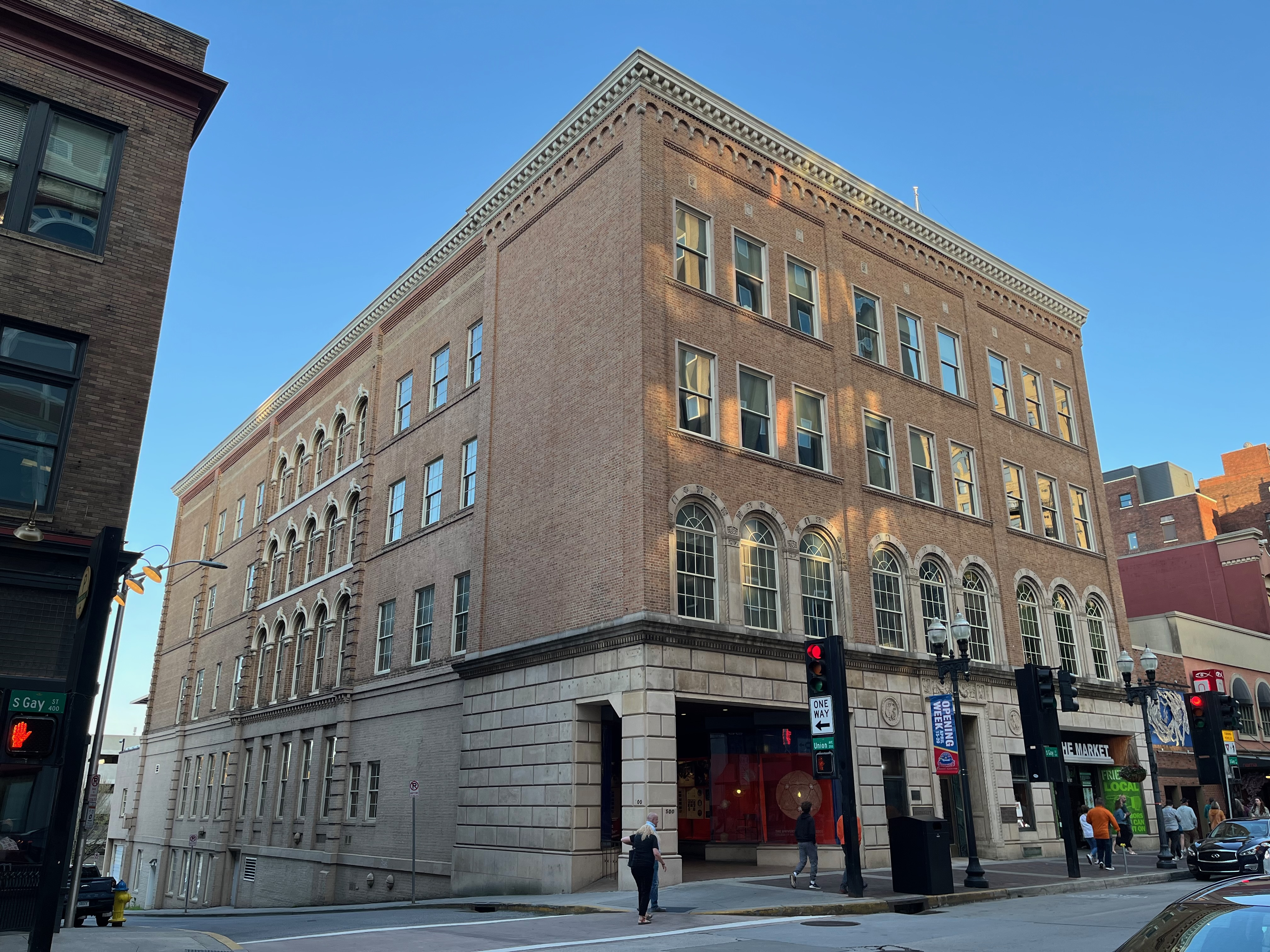
- The building in 2025
- Location: 500–504 Gay St. Knoxville, Tennessee
- Coordinates: 35°57′55″N 83°55′5″W
- Area: less than one acre
- Built: 1871, remodeled 1929
- Architectural style: Second Renaissance Revival
- NRHP reference No.: 84003566
- Added to NRHP: July 12, 1984

The Fidelity Building is an office building in Knoxville, Tennessee, United States. Initially constructed in 1871 for the wholesale firm Cowan, McClung and Company, the building underwent an exterior renovation and was converted to Fidelity-Bankers Trust Company in 1929 and has since been renovated for use as office space. In 1984, the building was added to the National Register of Historic Places for its architecture and its role in Knoxville's late-nineteenth century wholesaling industry.

Cowan, McClung and Company was formed in 1858 by Knoxville merchants James H. Cowan, Perez Dickinson, and several members of the McClung family. During the years following the Civil War, the company became one of the most profitable in Tennessee as Knoxville's wholesaling market grew exponentially. The company erected its four-story headquarters on Gay Street's 500-block in 1871, and occupied the building until 1919. Another wholesale firm, Anderson-Dulin-Varnell, operated out of the building until 1929. The Fidelity-Bankers Trust Company occupied the building from 1929 until 1964.

The Fidelity Building is currently the headquarters of the wholesale grocery company, H. T. Hackney. In May 2011, the company announced plans to open a grocery store on the building's ground floor.

== Design ==
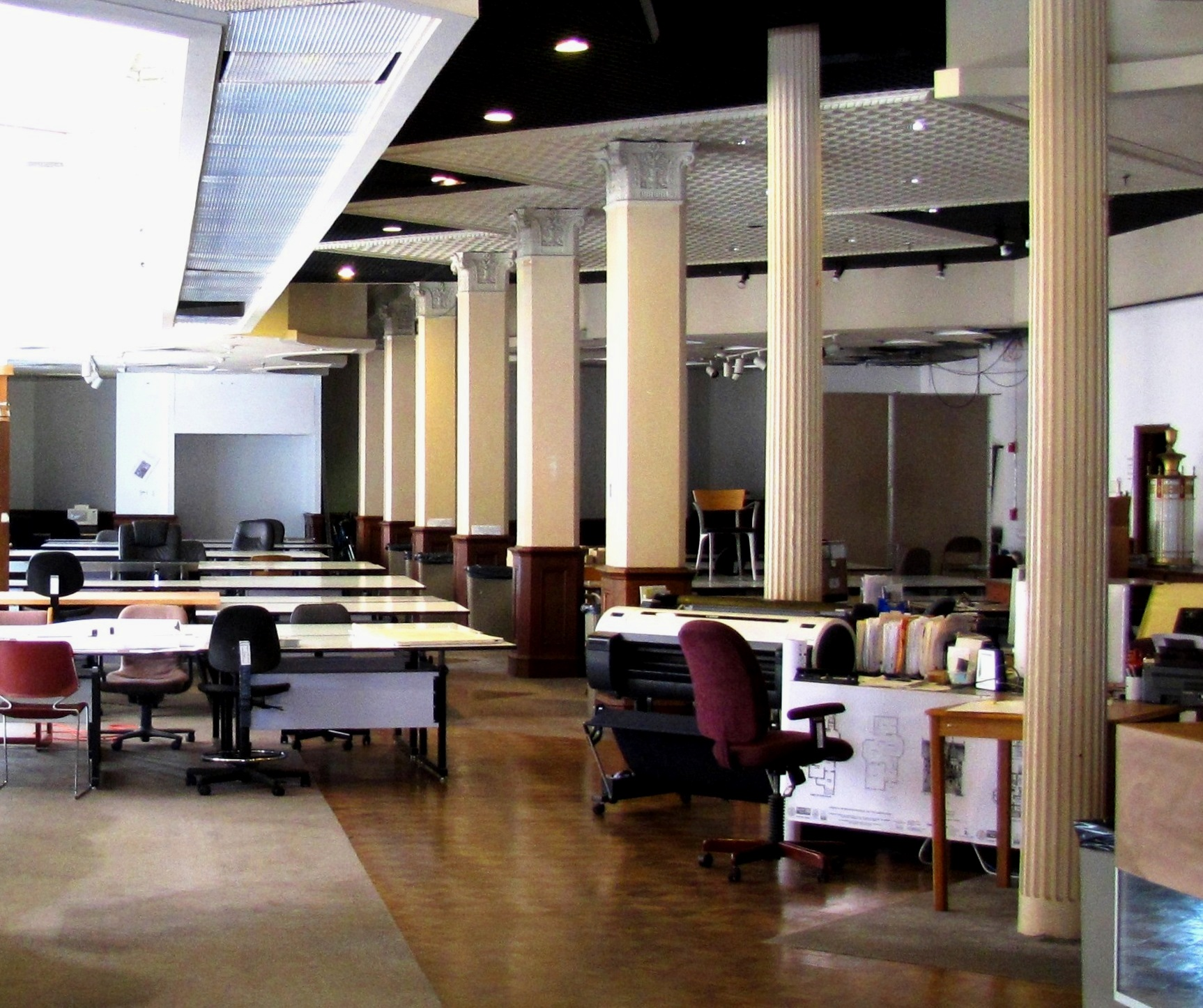
Interior in 2010

The Fidelity Building is a four-story, three-bay brick building originally constructed in 1871, and extensively remodeled in 1929. The building was originally designed in an Italianate style, and contained a central pediment and balustrade, and storefronts flanked by Corinthian columns. In 1929, the architectural firm Baumann and Baumann remodeled the building, and the pediment, balustrade, and exterior Corinthian columns were removed.

The building's first-story Gay Street facade, which reflects the 1929 remodeling, consists of an ashlar veneer, with a recessed entrance topped by an eagle-and-garland frieze. The rear of the building is largely unaltered from its 1871 design, the exception being a one-story addition added in the early 1980s. The building's interior, which also reflects the 1929 remodeling, includes a central hall with gray marble walls and floors, and square Corinthian columns.

== History ==
=== Cowan, McClung and Company ===
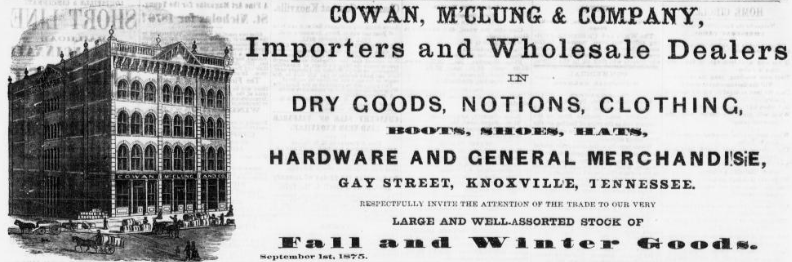
1875 ad for Cowan, McClung & Company in the Knoxville Chronicle, with the Fidelity Building pictured on the left

Cowan, McClung and Company was formed in 1858 by the merger of two Knoxville wholesalers– Cowan and Dickinson, operated by James Cowan (1801–1871) and Perez Dickinson (1813–1901), and McClung, Wallace and Company, operated by the McClung family. Cowan was a nephew of Nathaniel and Samuel Cowan, who had opened Knoxville's first general store in 1792, and was a stepson of Thomas Humes, who had established the Lamar House Hotel in 1816. In 1820, Cowan opened his first store, located at the corner of Gay and Main, using money he had borrowed from his mother.

In 1832, Cowan formed a partnership with Dickinson, a Massachusetts-born professor who had moved to Knoxville several years earlier to teach at East Tennessee University. Cowan and Dickinson built a larger, two-story store, and in subsequent years, the corner of Gay and Main became known as "Dickinson's Corner." The McClung family, descendants of Knoxville surveyor Charles McClung, had been active in Knoxville's wholesale trade since 1816, and by 1850, the family controlled two major Knoxville wholesaling firms, C. M. McClung and Company and McClung, Wallace and Company.

As the nexus of the relatively isolated farming communities of East Tennessee and the great manufacturing centers of the eastern United States, Knoxville grew into a wholesaling mecca in the years following the Civil War. By 1866, Cowan, McClung and Company, the state's leading wholesaler, was generating more tax revenue than other firm in the state. The following year, Cowan and two of his McClung partners reported three of the five highest personal incomes in Knox County. The company built its new four-story warehouse and store at the corner of Union and Gay in 1871, and within three years, the company was earning $2 million annually.

=== Later history ===
Cowan, McClung and Company closed in 1919, and another wholesaler, Anderson-Dulin-Varnell, moved into the building at the corner of Union and Gay. During the 1920s, Anderson-Dulin-Varnell, which operated the nearby Miller's Department Store, was one of Knoxville most successful retailers. In 1929, the Fidelity-Bankers Trust Company, one of Knoxville's leading financial institutions, became the building's third occupant. Fidelity operated out of the building until 1964, when it merged with Tennessee Valley Bank and moved to a new building on Market Street.

The Fidelity Building is currently the headquarters of the H.T. Hackney Company, which bills itself as one of the nation's largest wholesale grocery distributors. The company has operated a small convenience store in the lower south section of the building for several years. In May 2011, the company announced plans to expand the convenience store into a full-scale grocery, in partnership with Maryville-based retailer, The Market. Since 2006, the University of Tennessee's Knoxville Downtown Studio has operated out of the northern half of the building's first floor.

== See also ==
- Customs House, Knoxville
- Old City Hall (Knoxville)
