= United States Post Office and Courthouse (Knoxville, Tennessee) =

- Knoxville Post Office
- U.S. National Register of Historic Places
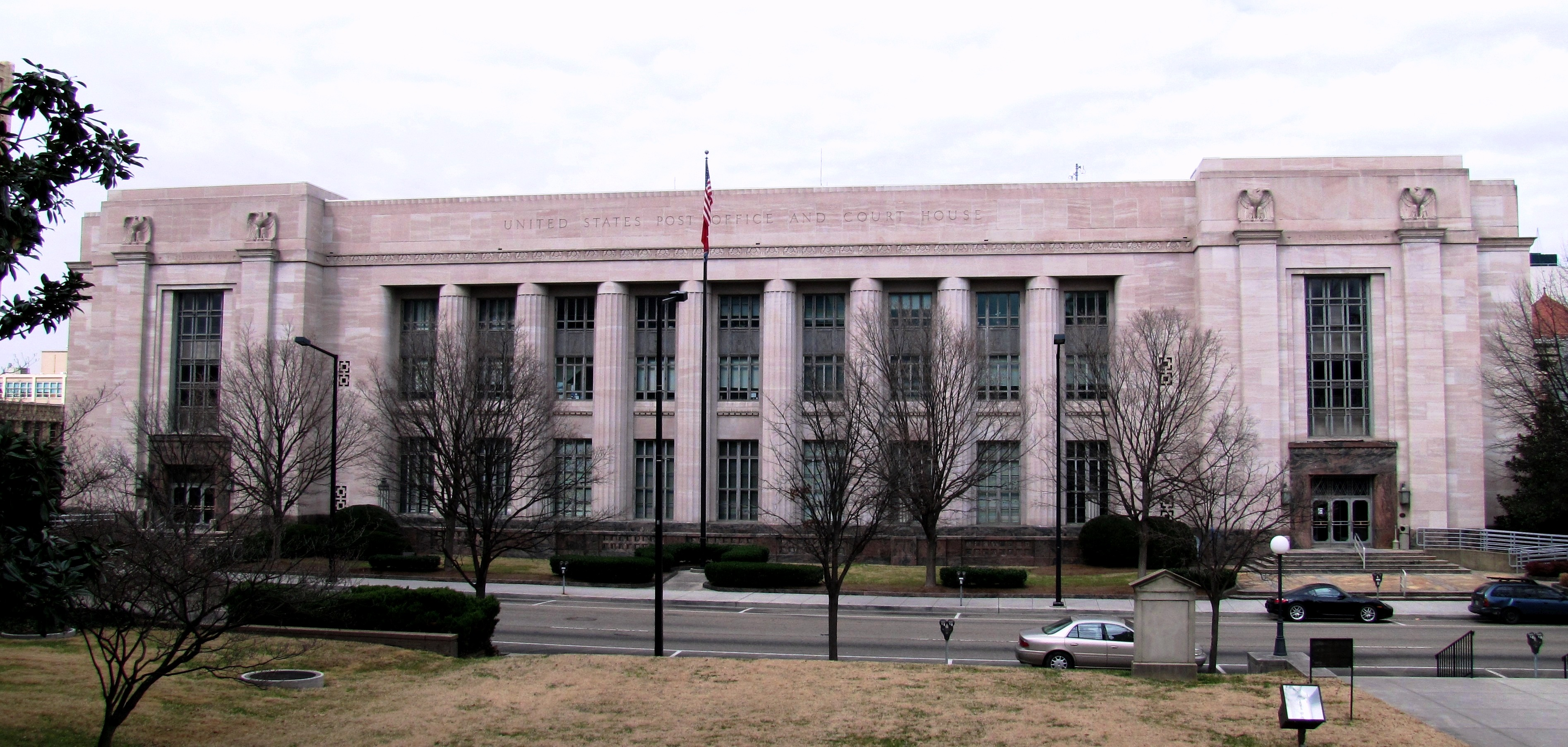
- The building in 2011

- Location within Tennessee Location within the United States
- Location: 501 Main St. Knoxville, Tennessee, USA
- Coordinates: 35°57′39″N 83°55′8″W
- Area: 1.9 acres (0.77 ha)
- Built: 1934
- Architect: Baumann and Baumann
- Architectural style: Moderne, Art Deco
- NRHP reference No.: 84003567
- Added to NRHP: May 31, 1984

The United States Post Office and Courthouse, commonly called the Knoxville Post Office, is a state building located at 501 Main Street in Knoxville, Tennessee, United States. Constructed in 1934 for use as a post office and federal courthouse, the building contains numerous Art Deco and Moderne elements, and is clad in Tennessee marble. While the building is still used as a branch post office, the court section is now used by the state courts. The building is listed on the National Register of Historic Places for its architecture and political significance.

== Design ==
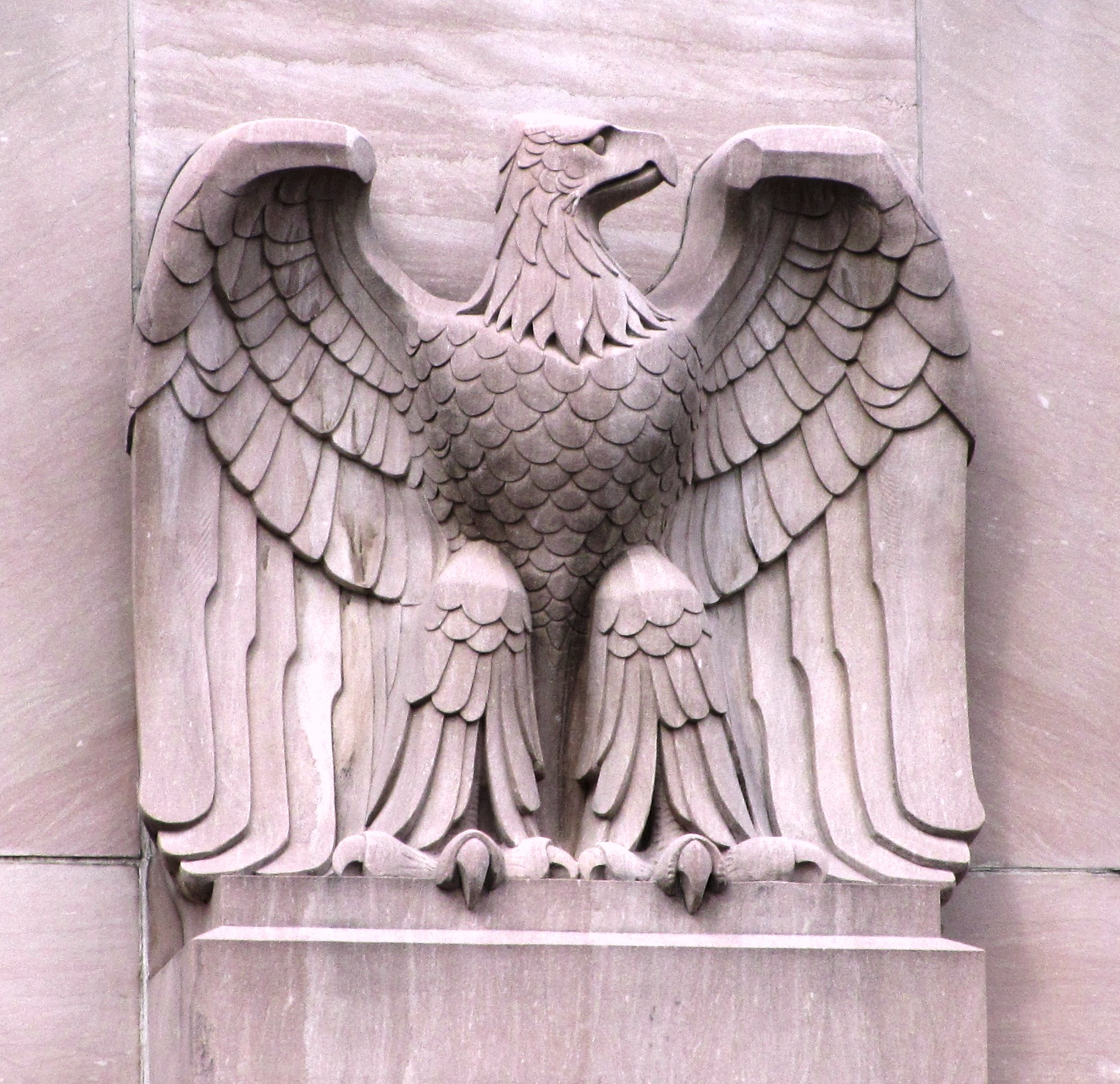
One of the building's four eagles carved by sculptor Albert Milani

The Knoxville Post Office is a three-story structure occupying the lot bounded by Main Street, Locust Street, Walnut Street, and Cumberland Avenue. The building measures 250 feet (76 m) by 138 feet (42 m), and contains 123,000 square feet of gross space. The first floor is used primarily for the post office, while the upper floors contain the court room and offices. The lot includes a large parking lot behind the building, mainly for postal service vehicles.

The building was constructed using six different types of Tennessee marble, a locally quarried stone used in monumental buildings throughout the United States. The exterior, clad mostly in Tennessee "pink" marble, includes a facade of imposing columns, Moderne-style cylindrical molding along the roofline, and four eagle statues carved by Candoro Marble Works sculptor Albert Milani (1892–1972). The entrances are located at the corners of the building, while the front of the building contains aluminum casement windows and a sunken courtyard. This courtyard is masked by a retaining wall built of red Tennessee marble, and topped with Art Deco light fixtures.

The interior of the building contains numerous Art Deco elements, namely grillwork with floral motifs, floral patterns in the entrance transoms, aluminum spandrels on the upper floors with floral and zigzag patterns, and a plaster ceiling with aluminum floral and zigzag moldings (this ceiling was later hidden by the installation of a tiled ceiling in the 1960s). The first floor contains a marble floor and marble, aluminum, and bronze paneling. The courtroom floor is made of cork wood.

== History ==
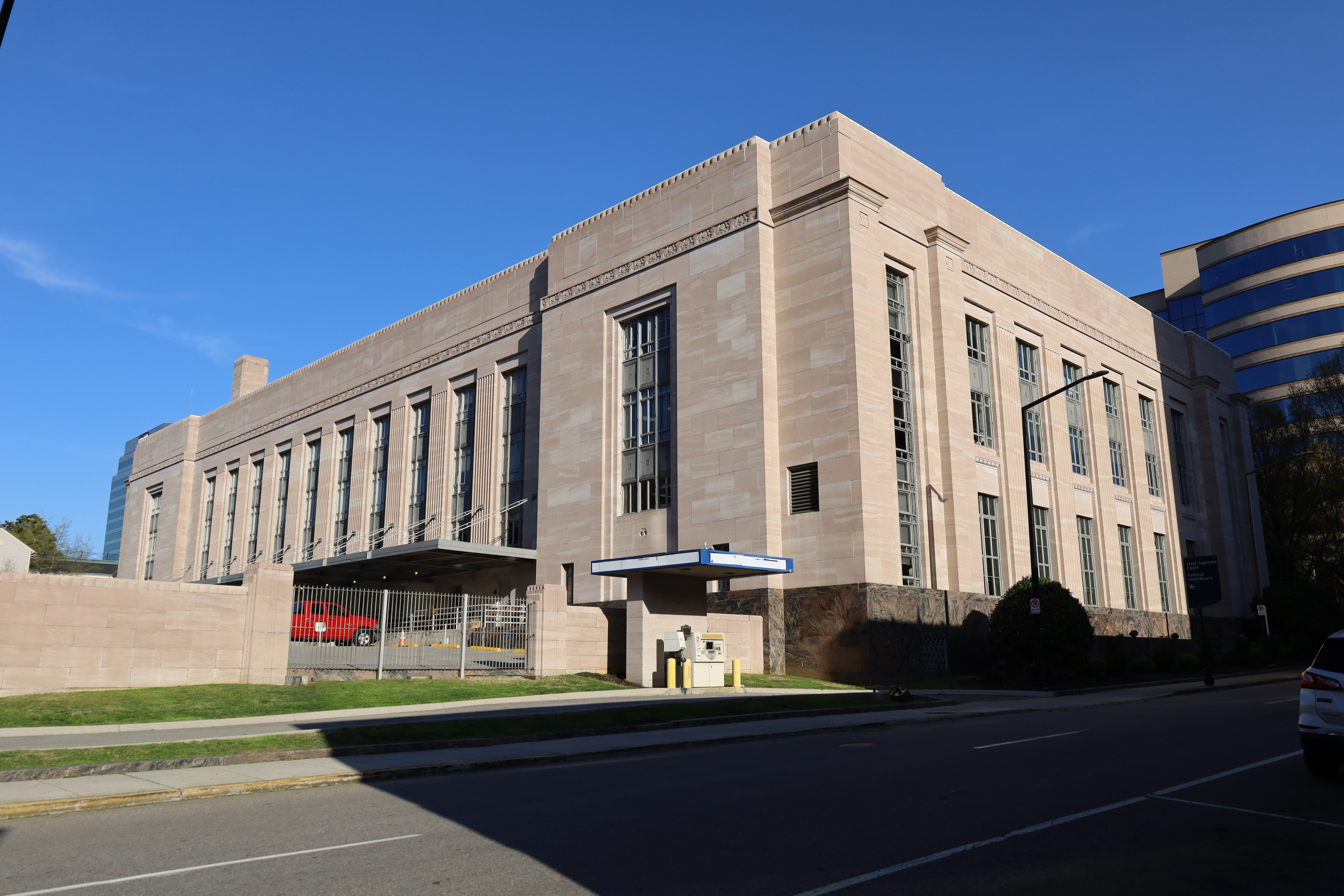
Rear of the building in 2025

The lot on which the Knoxville Post Office now stands was part of James White's 1795 extension of the city. By 1886, this lot contained several large houses and townhouses. By the time the federal government purchased the lot for the post office's construction, it was occupied by the home of prominent Knoxville physician Walter S. Nash and his wife, Eva.

Knoxville's first federal building, the Old Customs House, was built on Market Street in 1874, and expanded in 1910. By the following decade, the city's growing population had rendered this building too small for the city's postal needs. In the late 1920s, Congress appropriated several million dollars for the construction of new postal facilities across the country. Senator Kenneth McKellar and Congressman J. Will Taylor, both from Tennessee, managed to have some of this money allocated for the construction of a new post office and federal courthouse for Knoxville.

The new post office and courthouse was designed by Baumann and Baumann, a prominent local firm that had recently designed the Andrew Johnson Hotel on Gay Street. The firm's two chief partners were Albert Baumann Sr. (1861–1942) and his son, Albert Baumann Jr. (1897–1952). Albert Baumann Jr., had studied architecture at the University of Pennsylvania under Beaux-Arts champion Paul Cret, and the design of the Knoxville post office was likely conceived from a Treasury Department model inspired by Cret.

The A.W. Kushe Company of Detroit was hired as the contractor for the new building. Construction began in December 1932, and was completed in February 1934. On February 15 of that year, the new building was dedicated in a ceremony attended by Congressman Taylor and Knoxville Mayor John O'Connor. The new post office opened about a month later, on March 11, 1934.

The Knoxville Post Office was renovated in 1964, during which time a lower, tiled ceiling was installed. In the 1990s, most federal court functions were shifted to the Howard Baker Jr., Federal Courthouse a few blocks down the street. In 2003, the building was again renovated, this time by the contracting firm Denark Construction, following a design by Cope Associates. These renovations involved remodeling of the first floor, and renovations to tenant spaces. The building continues to operate as a branch post office, and the courthouse section now houses the Tennessee State Criminal Court of Appeals and the eastern division of the Tennessee Supreme Court.

The post office is twice mentioned in Cormac McCarthy's 1979 novel, Suttree. In one instance, the title character traverses the building's long ground-floor corridor to briefly escape the bitter cold. In another scene, an itinerant mountain wanderer known as "the goatman" is chastised by a police officer for allowing his goats to graze on the post office's lawn.

== See also ==
- Knox County Courthouse (Tennessee)
- Knoxville City-County Building
- Old City Hall (Knoxville)
