= Old Customs House (Knoxville, Tennessee) =

- Old Post Office Building
- U.S. National Register of Historic Places
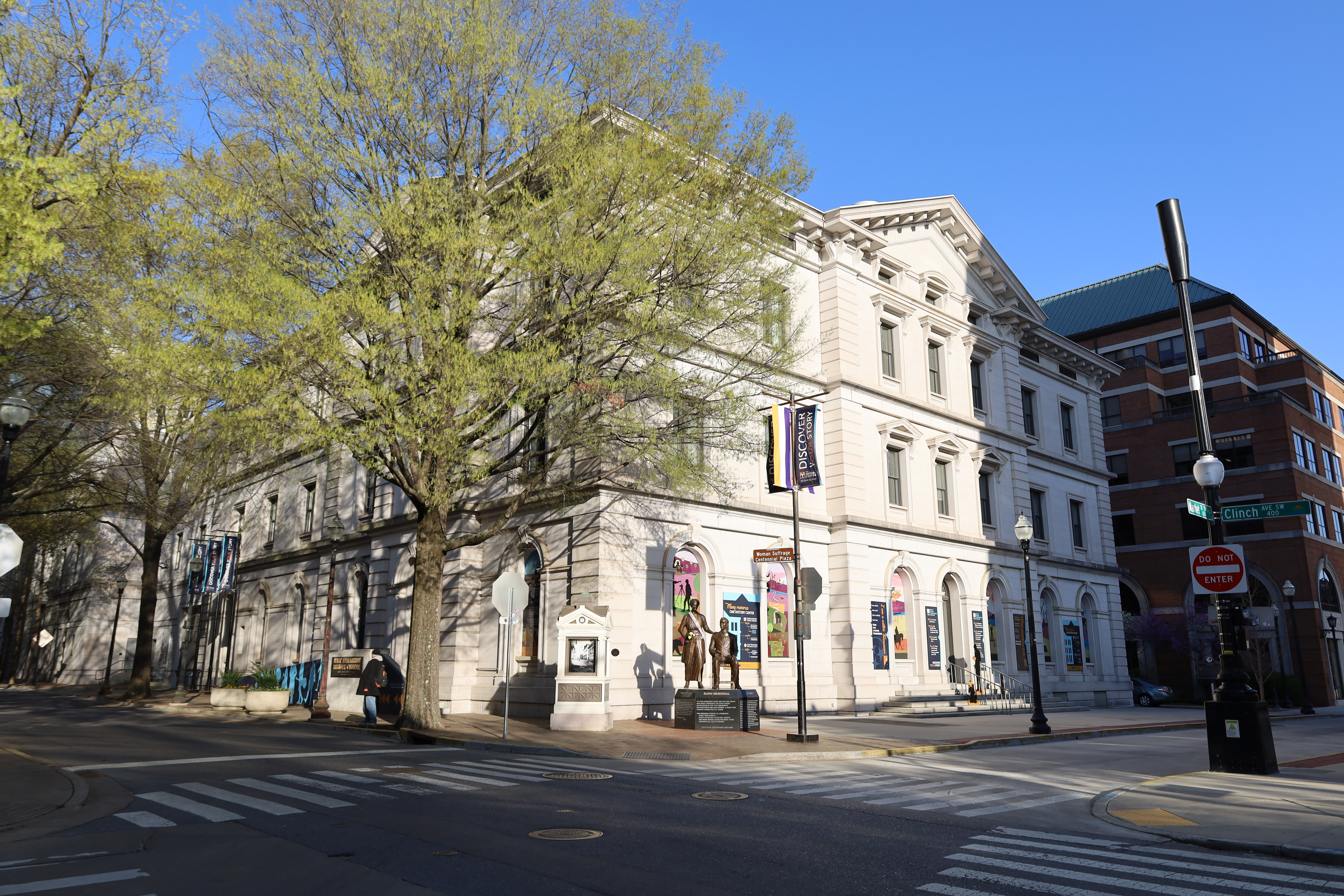
- The building in 2025

- Location within Tennessee Location within the United States
- Location: Clinch Avenue and Market Street; Knoxville, Tennessee
- Coordinates: 35°57′49″N 83°55′7″W
- Architect: Alfred B. Mullett
- Architectural style: Renaissance Revival
- NRHP reference No.: 73001804
- Added to NRHP: March 20, 1973

The Old Customs House, also called the Old Post Office, is a historic building located at the corner of Clinch Avenue and Market Street in Knoxville, Tennessee, United States. Completed in 1874, it was the city's first federal building. It housed the federal courts, excise offices and post office until 1933. From 1936 to 1976, it was used by the Tennessee Valley Authority for offices. Expanded in 2004, the building is home to the East Tennessee History Center, which includes the Lawson McGhee Library's Calvin M. McClung Historical Collection, the Knox County Archives, and the East Tennessee Historical Society's headquarters and museum. The building is listed on the National Register of Historic Places for its architectural significance.

== Design ==
The Old Customs House is a three-story Italianate style building sheathed in East Tennessee marble. The smooth exterior walls contrast with rusticated quoins at the building's corners. The former courtroom on the third floor is notable for its neoclassical detailing. Much of the original interior has been altered.

== History ==
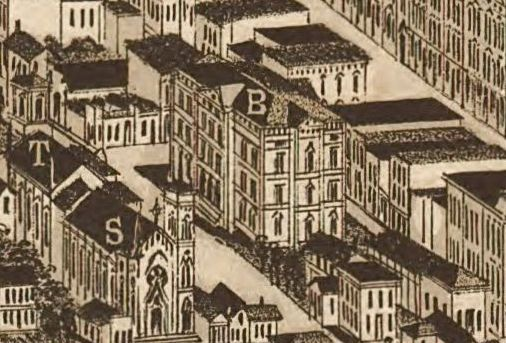
The Old Customs House, as it appeared in 1886

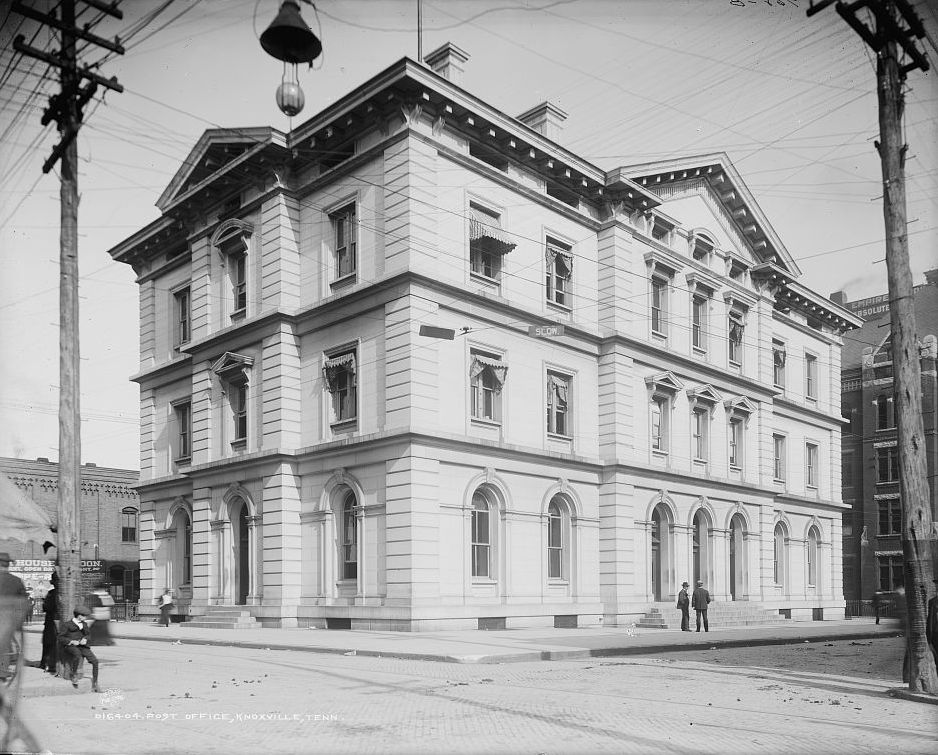
The Old Customs House, as photographed by the Detroit Publishing Company in the early 1900s

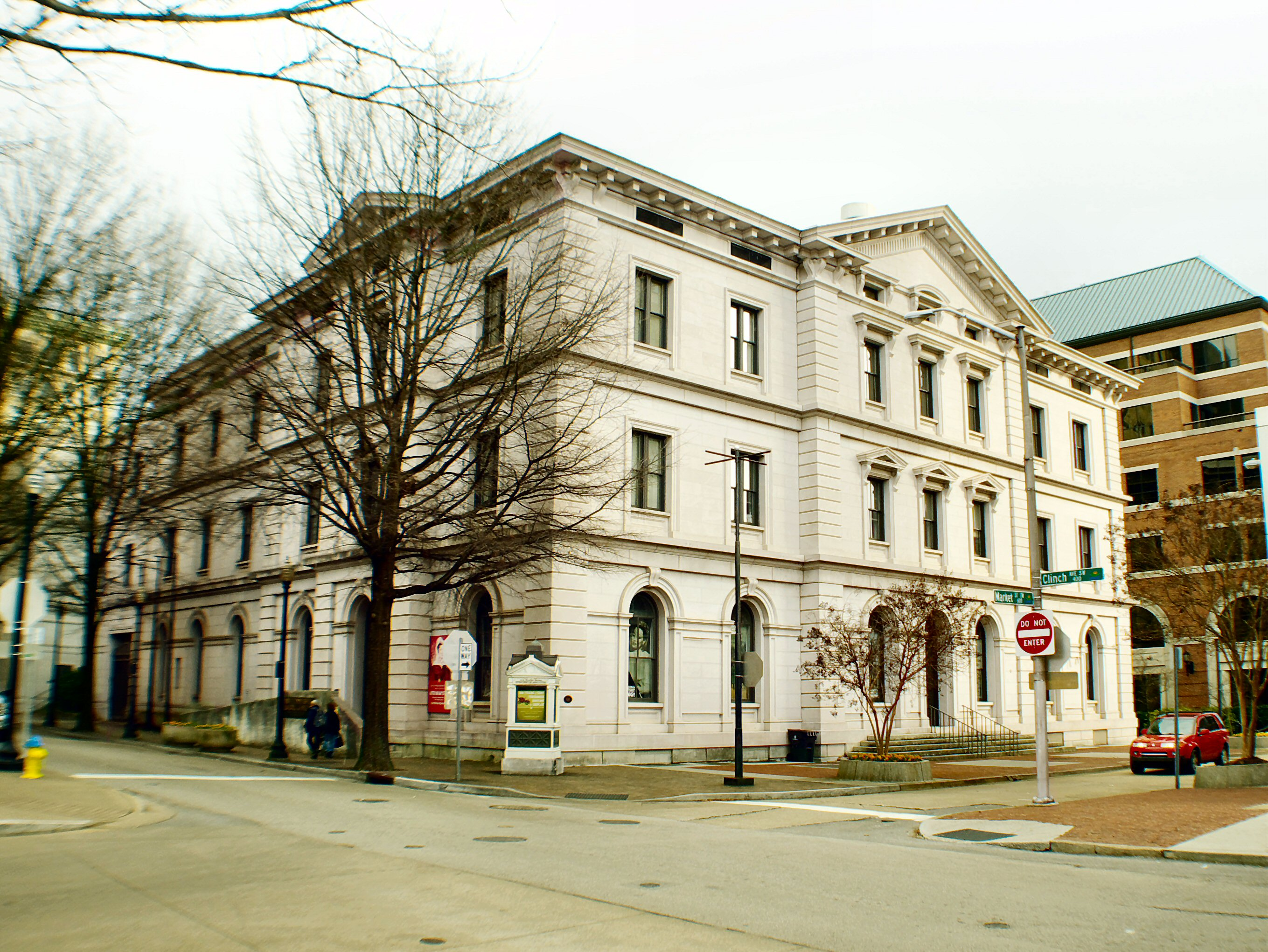
The building in 2014

The Customs House is situated on what was originally Lot 11 of James White's 1795 extension of Knoxville. An 1871 map of Knoxville shows the property as an open grove surrounded by a few small houses.

Through the 1850s, Congress was petitioned by cities across the country to provide courtrooms and post offices.

Congress appropriated funding for Knoxville's Customs House in 1856, and reappropriated the funding in 1869. Construction of the original portion of the Customs House (at the corner of Clinch and Market), designed by U.S. government chief architect Alfred B. Mullett (1834–1890), began in 1871 and was completed in 1874. The first floor was used as a post office, while the second and third floors were used for the federal court and office space for federal officials.

As Knoxville's population quadrupled in the late 19th century, the increased postal activity left the Customs House critically overcrowded, and the building was enlarged in 1910. The building had a steam plant for heating and used electricity provided by the Knoxville Railway & Light Company.

Knoxville's continued growth rendered the Customs House insufficient for the city's postal needs, and a new post office was built on Main Street in 1934. Ownership of the Customs House was transferred to the Tennessee Valley Authority. In 1976, ownership of the Customs House was transferred to Knox County for use by the Lawson McGhee Library's Calvin M. McClung Historical Collection and the Knox County Archives.

In the 1980s, the East Tennessee Historical Society (ETHS) moved to the Customs House and set up the East Tennessee Historical Center. The society opened the Museum of East Tennessee History in 1993. In 2000, the second-floor corridor of the building was named Deaderick Hall in honor of librarian Lucile Deaderick (1914–2006).

In 2004, a BarberMcMurry-designed eastern extension to the Customs House was completed, extending the structure the length of Clinch Avenue from Market to Gay Street. This new complex, known as the East Tennessee History Center, includes the ETHS's headquarters, the Museum of East Tennessee History, the Calvin M. McClung Historical Collection, and the Knox County Archives. The Old Customs House is depicted in the ETHS logo.

== See also ==
- Fidelity Building (Knoxville)
- Greystone (Knoxville)
- Knox County Courthouse (Tennessee)
- Old City Hall (Knoxville)

== Sources ==
- Isenhour, Judith Clayton. Knoxville - A Pictorial History. (Donning, 1978), pages 122-124.
- Knoxville: Fifty Landmarks. (Knoxville: The Knoxville Heritage Committee of the Junior League of Knoxville, 1976), page 11.
