= Knox County Courthouse (Tennessee) =

- U.S. National Register of Historic Places
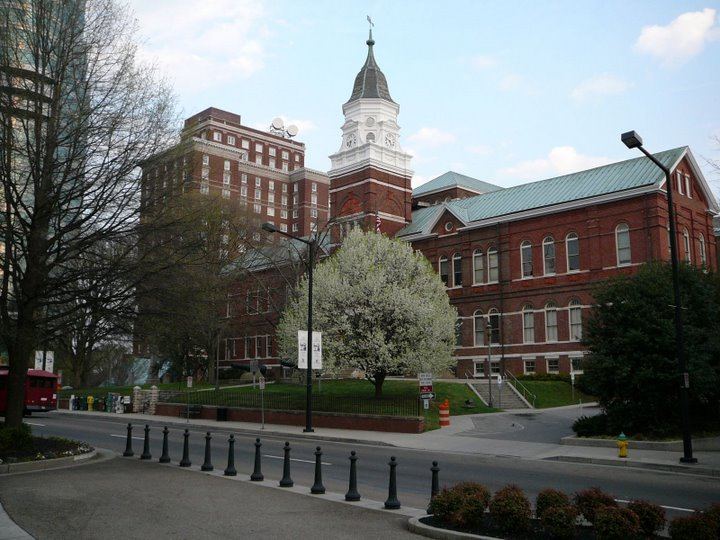
- Knox County Courthouse

- Location within Tennessee Location within the United States
- Interactive map showing the location of Knox County Courthouse
- Location: Knoxville, Tennessee
- Coordinates: 35°57′39″N 83°55′1″W
- Built: 1886, additions 1919
- NRHP reference No.: 73001803
- Added to NRHP: April 24, 1973

The Knox County Courthouse is a historic building located at 300 Main Street in Knoxville, Tennessee, United States. Built in 1886, it served as Knox County's courthouse until the completion of the City-County Building in 1980, and continues to house offices for several county departments. John Sevier, Tennessee's first governor, is buried on the courthouse lawn. The courthouse is listed on the National Register of Historic Places for its architecture and its role in the county's political history.

== Design ==
The courthouse is a 2.5-story brick structure with an imposing clock tower. It contains a mixture of architectural styles, including Colonial elements in the clock tower and Gothic elements (including quatrefoil patterns) in the balcony and porch. Much of the interior has been altered.

== History ==
The Knox County Courthouse sits on what was originally Lot 36 of Charles McClung's 1791 plat of Knoxville. The lot across the street to the north (Lot 37), currently occupied by the federal courthouse, was the lot set aside by James White for the county courthouse. The county's first courthouse was completed circa 1793, but was considered an eyesore. Thomas William Humes stated that a "frolicsome Irishman" burned this first courthouse down within a few years of its construction, to the delight of the city's residents. The lot of the current courthouse was originally occupied by a federal blockhouse made famous by a Lloyd Branson painting.

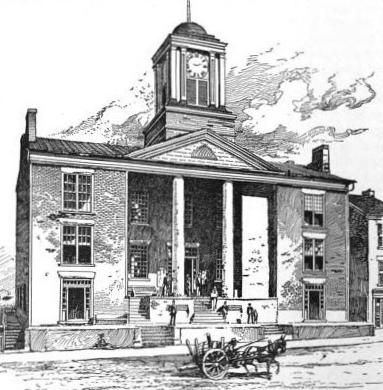
The "third" Knox County Courthouse (1842–1886), which stood on Main across the street from the present courthouse.

Knox County's second courthouse was built about 1797. This second courthouse was the setting for the George Washington Harris short story, "Eaves-Dropping a Lodge of Free-Masons." Harris described the "old stone Court-house" as having a "steep gable front to the street," a "disproportionately small brick chimney," "well-whittled door-jambs," "dusty windows," and "gloomy walls and ghosly echoes." By the 1830s, this courthouse had deteriorated, and local politicians began calling for its replacement.

Construction on Knox County's third courthouse began in 1839, and was completed in 1842. This third courthouse was a Federal-style structure with Greek Revival elements, and was constructed by John Dameron and Drury P. Armstrong.

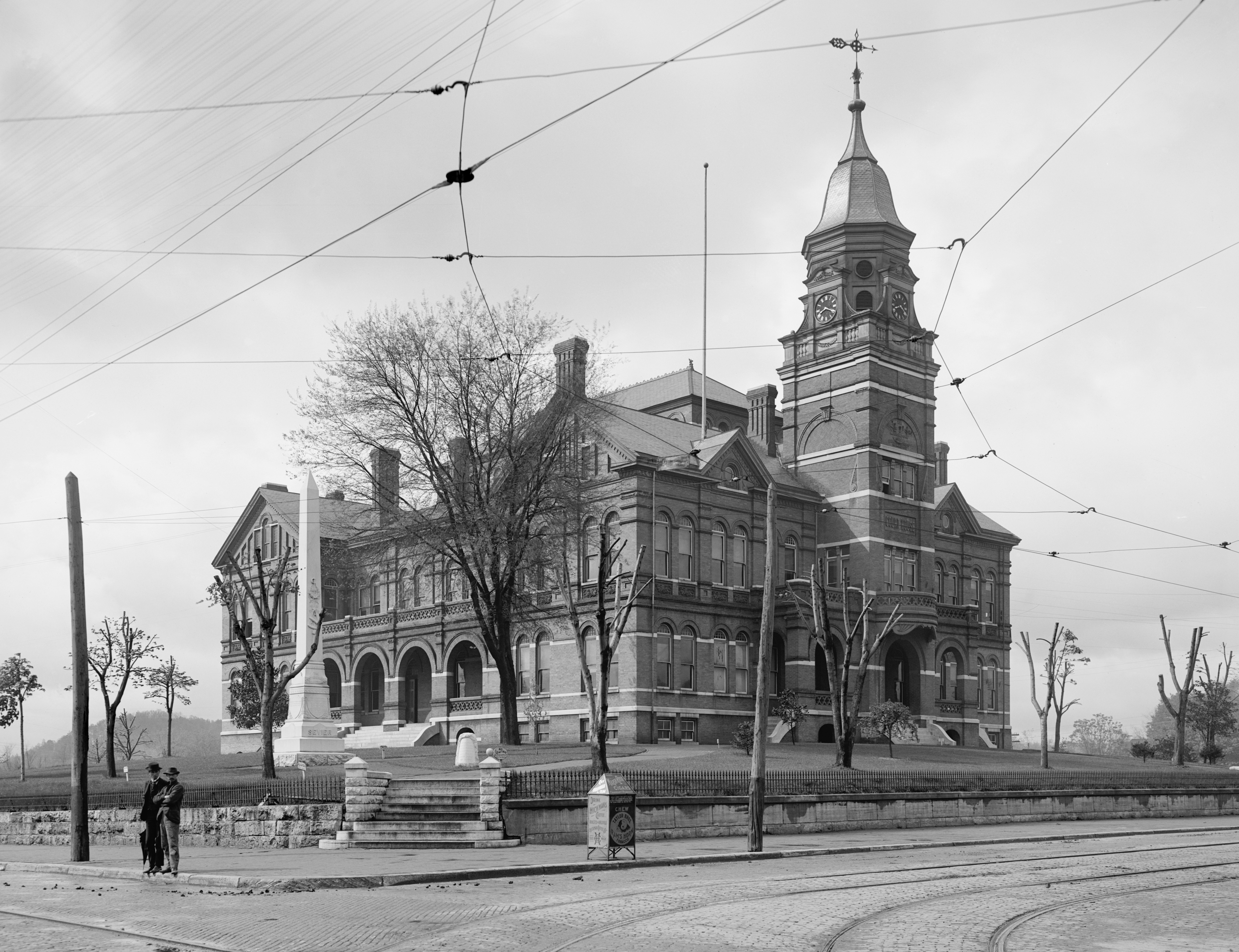
The Knox County Courthouse, as it appeared circa 1903, before the east and west wings were extended.

Construction of the fourth Knox County Courthouse began in 1884. The lot across the street from the third courthouse, then occupied by a large hotel known as the Mansion House, was purchased. The county hired Stephenson and Getaz, a local contractor and architect, to build the courthouse. This firm used drawings prepared by the New York architectural firm, Palliser and Palliser. Built at a cost of $82,000.00, this new courthouse was considered fireproof, and included a 2,500-pound bell. Wings (running parallel to Main Street) were added to the east and west sides in 1919.

In 1980, Knox County courts and many county government functions moved to the newly completed City County Building on Hill Avenue. In subsequent years, after talk surfaced of tearing the courthouse down, a movement led by Knox County Executive Dwight Kessel convinced the county to preserve it. The building continues to house several county offices, including the office of the county clerk.

== Cultural references ==
The Hank Williams Jr. song "Knoxville Courthouse Blues" refers to the courthouse.

Cormac McCarthy's 1965 novel, The Orchard Keeper, includes a scene in which one of the characters carries a dead chickenhawk into the courthouse, for which he is paid a $1 bounty. McCarthy also mentions the courthouse in his 1979 novel, Suttree, likening the sound of its bell to "a fogwarning on some shrouded coast."

== Monuments ==
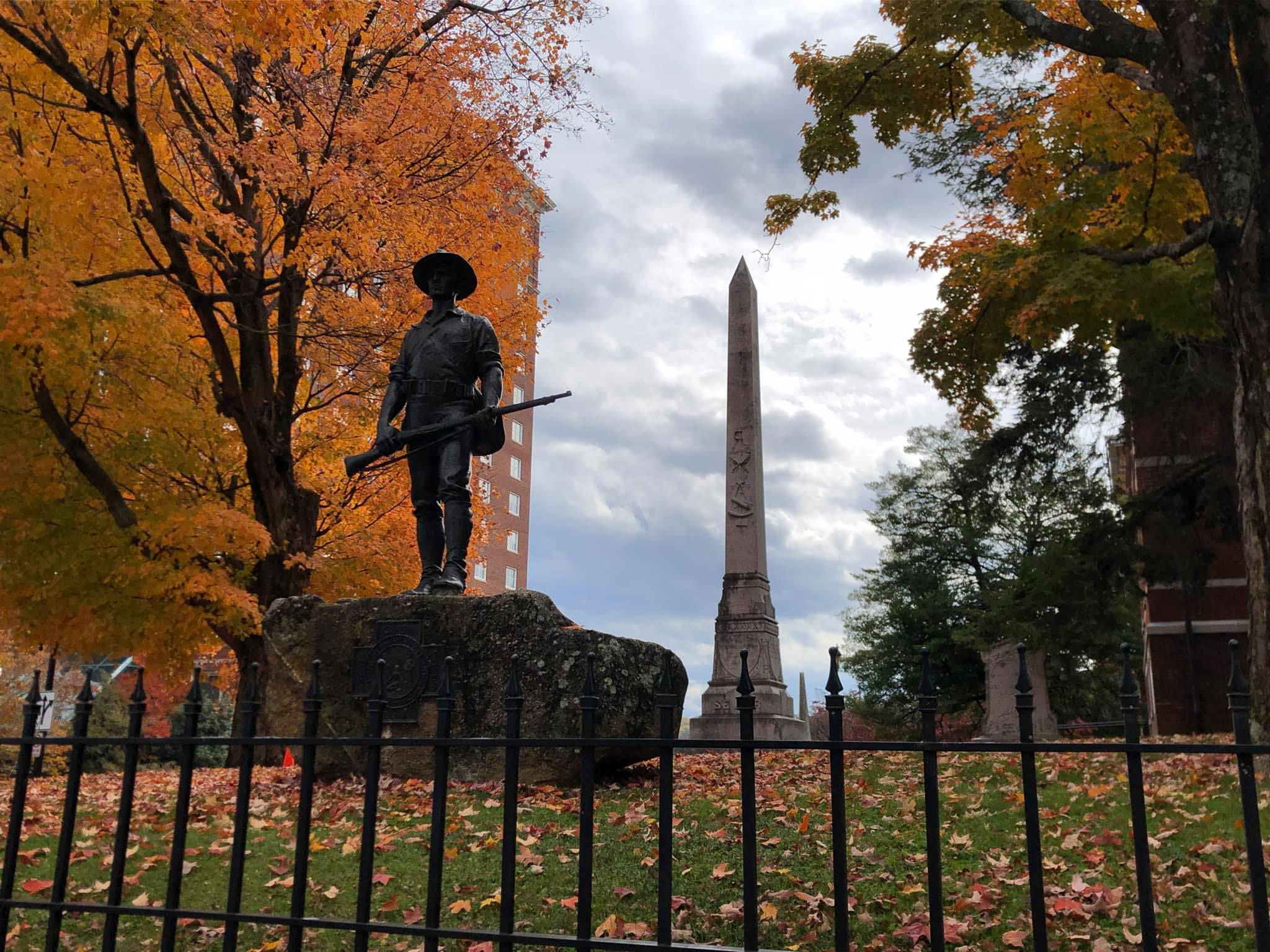
The Spanish–American War Monument (left) and the grave of John Sevier (center).

Tennessee's first governor, John Sevier (1745–1815), was originally buried in the Mississippi Territory where he died while surveying what would eventually become the Alabama-Georgia border. In 1889, a delegation led by Tennessee Governor Robert Love Taylor had Sevier's remains extracted and reinterred in the lawn of the Knox County Courthouse. A monument was placed on the grave in 1893. In 1922, a movement led by former Knoxville Mayor Samuel Heiskell managed to reinter the remains of Sevier's second wife, Catherine "Bonny Kate" Sherrill Sevier, next to her husband. In 1946, a Sevier descendant, Mary Headman, placed a marker on the lawn honoring Sevier's first wife, Sarah Hawkins.

Other monuments include the marble arched structure dedicated to Dr. John Mason Boyd (1833–1909), which faces the Gay Street/Main Street intersection, and stone monuments commemorating the site of the 1790s-era federal blockhouse, Knoxville's status as the first capital of Tennessee, and the 1791 signing of the Treaty of Holston. Another monument, "The Hiker," was erected by the county's Spanish–American War veterans in memory of their fellow soldiers, sailors and marines who died in the conflict. Two Tennessee Historical Commission markers recall the Treaty of Holston and the third, or "Old Knox County (1842–1886) Courthouse," which was located across from the present courthouse on Main Street.

== See also ==
- Old City Hall (Knoxville)
- Old Customs House (Knoxville, Tennessee)
- United States Post Office and Courthouse (Knoxville, Tennessee)
