= East Tennessee Historical Society =

- Abbreviation: ETHS
- Predecessor: East Tennessee Historical and Antiquarian Society (c. 1834–1852)
- Formation: May 5, 1834
- Type: Historical society
- Headquarters: Knoxville, Tennessee, U.S.
- Coordinates: 35.96411°N 83.91780°W
- Region served: East Tennessee, Southern Appalachia
- Chairman: Sam Albritton
- President & CEO: Warren Dockter
- Main organ: Journal of East Tennessee History
- Website: easttnhistory.org

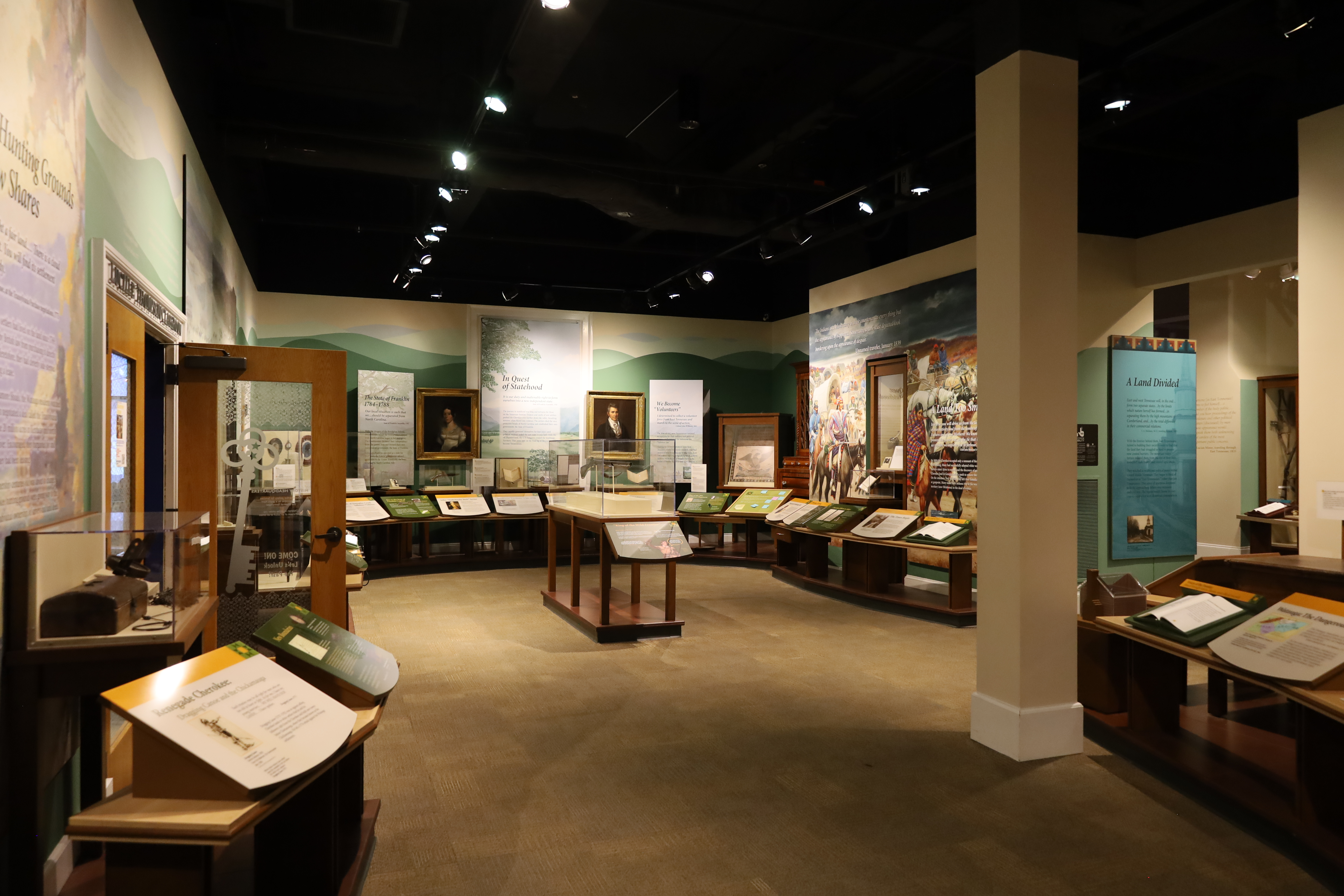
Exhibits in the museum in 2025

The East Tennessee Historical Society (ETHS), headquartered in Knoxville, Tennessee, United States, is a non-profit organization dedicated to the study of East Tennessee history, the preservation of historically significant artifacts, and educating the citizens of Tennessee. The society operates a museum and museum shop in the East Tennessee History Center on Gay Street in downtown Knoxville. The East Tennessee Historical Society was established in 1834, 38 years after the establishment of the state of Tennessee, to record the history of the development and settlement of the area.

== History ==
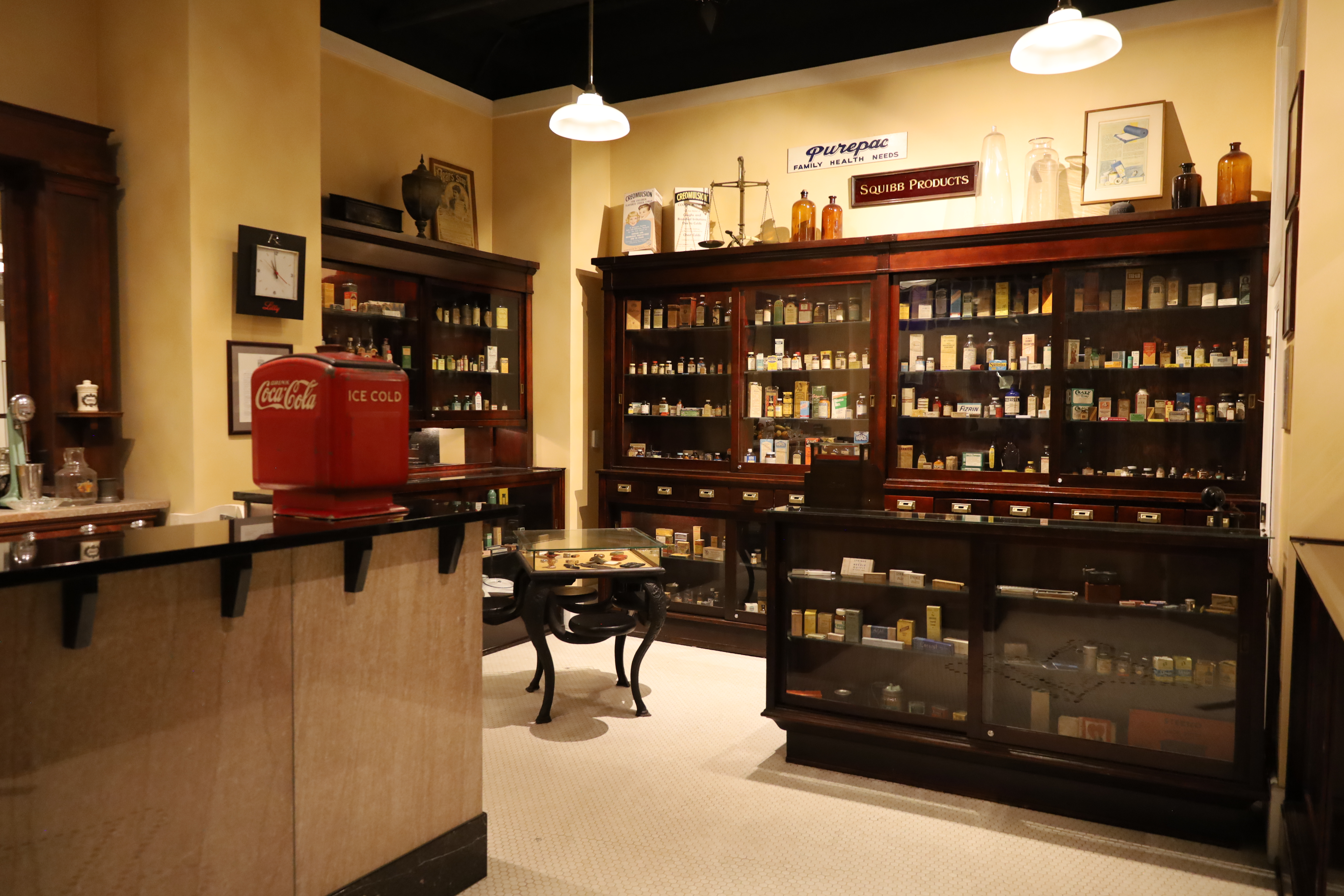
Exhibits in the museum in 2025

The East Tennessee Historical and Antiquarian Society was founded by Tennessee historian J. G. M. Ramsey (1797–1884), who sought to archive the papers and correspondence of the state's pioneers. The first meeting of the society was May 5, 1834. East Tennessee College president William B. Reese was elected as the first president and the executive committee included John Hervey Crozier and Thomas William Humes. As the society's recording secretary, Ramsey acquired a collection of papers and correspondence from early Tennesseans such as William Blount, John Sevier, Samuel Wear, Alexander Outlaw, and James Hubbert. The "Antiquarian" was dropped from the society's name by 1852.

Ramsey kept the society's archives at his plantation, Mecklenburg, east of Knoxville. The archives were destroyed when Mecklenburg was burned in the Civil War. By the end of the war, the society had disintegrated.

In January 1883, Confederate veterans, led by Moses White and William Henderson joined Ramsey and Crozier in reviving the East Tennessee Historical Society as an auxiliary of the Southern Historical Association. In 1885, University of Tennessee professor William Gibbs McAdoo served as president and future Knoxville mayor Samuel G. Heiskell served as vice president. Other members included newspaper editor William Rule and scholar Eben Alexander. The society began admitting women and hosted lectures on Fort Loudoun, Irish nationalist John Mitchel, and the state of Franklin, and featured speaker Fitzhugh Lee. By the end of the century, the second incarnation of the ETHS was no longer active.

In December 1924, Knoxville-area educators and librarians met at the Lawson McGhee Library to discuss reviving the ETHS and a new society met on January 16, 1925. Charter members included U.T. professor Philip Hamer, Lawson McGhee librarian Mary U. Rothrock, and U.T. president James Hoskins. The society began publishing its annual scholarly journal in 1929 and hosted lectures by historians Stanley J. Folmsbee and Samuel Cole Williams. The society published its first book, Folmsbee's Sectionalism and Internal Improvements in Tennessee, in 1939.

In 1946, the society published a comprehensive history of Knox County, The French Broad-Holston Country, as part of the state's sequicentennial celebrations. The book, edited by Rothrock, included a history of the county written by Folmsbee with contributions by Harvey Broome. A revised edition was published in 1972.

In 1976, the society published a comprehensive history of Knoxville, Heart of the Valley: A History of Knoxville, Tennessee. The book was edited by Lucile Deaderick, and included a history of the city by William MacArthur. MacArthur's history was republished in the 1982 book, Knoxville: Crossroads of the New South, which included photographs from the McClung Collection.

In the late 1970s, Knox County acquired the Old Customs House to house the McClung Collection and the Knox County Archives. The ETHS set up its headquarters in the building and hired a professional staff. Under the directorship of Charles Faulkner Bryan and Mark Wetherington, the society’s membership doubled in the 1980s. With W. Todd Groce as executive director (1990-1995), the ETHS renamed its scholarly publication as the Journal of East Tennessee History, created the First Families of Tennessee project in 1992, and established the Museum of East Tennessee History in 1993.

== Publications ==
Since 1929, the society has published an annual collection of scholarly essays on the history and culture of East Tennessee. Initially known as Publications, the essays have been published as the Journal of East Tennessee History since 1990. The journal covers topics on historical and cultural issues related to East Tennessee and the southern Appalachian region, including the American Civil War, the early settlement of East Tennessee, post-Civil War Reconstruction, the Great Depression, World War I, World War II, and the 1982 World's Fair. The society publishes the tri-annual magazine "Tennessee Ancestors" and the quarterly newsletter "Newsline".

=== Books ===
==== List of books published by the ETHS ====
- Sectionalism and Internal Improvements in Tennessee, 1796 - 1845 by Stanley J. Folmsbee, 1939.
- Three Outstanding Lawyers of a Former Generation by John W. Green, 1943.
- The French Broad-Holston Country: A History of Knox County, Tennessee, edited by Mary Rothrock, 1946, reprinted 1972.
- The Early Career of David Crockett by Stanley J. Folmsbee and Anna Grace Catron, 1956.
- The Mercurial Sam Houston by Ernest Shearer, 1963.
- Knoxville's First Graveyard: Tombstone Inscriptions in the First Presbyterian Church Cemetery, 1800-1879, 1965.
- The Arts of East Tennessee in the Nineteenth Century, compiled by the Dulin Art Gallery, 1971.
- Valley So Wild: A Folk History by Alberta and Carson Brewer, 1975.
- Heart of the Valley: A History of Knoxville, Tennessee, edited by Lucile Deaderick, 1976.
- The Terror of Tellico Plains: The Memoirs of Ray H. Jenkins by Ray Jenkins, 1979.
- Dear Margaret: Letters From Oak Ridge to Margaret Mead by Thelma Present and Margaret Mead, 1985.
- Tennessee Towns: From Adams to Yorkville by Tom Siler, 1985.
- Quiet Places: The Burial Sites of Civil War Generals in Tennessee by Buckner and Nathaniel Cheairs Hughes, 1992.
- Early Inns and Taverns of East Tennessee: A Photoessay by Jane Gray Buchanan, 1996.
- Art and Furniture of East Tennessee: The Inaugural Exhibit of the Museum of East Tennessee History by Namuni Hale Young, 1997.

==== Reprints and revisions ====
- Occupation of East Tennessee and the Defense of Knoxville by Orlando Poe, 1963. Originally published in 1888.
- The Annals of Tennessee to the End of the Eighteenth Century by J.G.M. Ramsey, 1967. Originally published in 1853.
- Divided Loyalties: Fort Sanders and the Civil War in East Tennessee by Digby Gordon Seymour, 1984 (2nd ed.), 2002 (3rd ed.). Originally published in 1963.
- A Facsimile Edition of the Half-Century of Knoxville: The First Published Account of the Founding of Knoxville by Thomas William Humes, 1990. Originally published in 1852.
- Knoxville by Betsey Beeler Creekmore, 1991. Originally published in 1958.

== East Tennessee History Center ==
Museum of East Tennessee History
- Established: 1834
- Location: 601 South Gay Street; Knoxville, Tennessee 37901
- Type: History museum
- Public transit access: KAT Bus Lines 13, 14, 20, 21, 23, 31

The headquarters of the East Tennessee Historical Society is located in the East Tennessee History Center in the Old Customs House in Knoxville, which is owned by Knox County. This building, depicted in the ETHS logo, is home to the Historical Society's Museum of East Tennessee History, which features cultural and historical exhibits from the region. Displays include items owned by Davy Crockett and John Sevier, memorabilia from the Appalachian Expositions of 1910 and 1911, artifacts from the Battle of Fort Sanders, a complete trolley car, a drugstore display, and early country music instruments and memorabilia. The center displays works by regional artists such as Lloyd Branson, Adelia Armstrong Lutz, Catherine Wiley, and Joseph Knaffl.

The history center contains the Knox County Archives and the Calvin M. McClung Collection of the Knox County Public Libraries.

== First Families of Tennessee and Civil War Families of Tennessee ==
The East Tennessee Historical Society maintains two honorary organizations for genealogical research. The First Families of Tennessee is an organization of individuals who can trace their ancestry to families who lived in the area that became Tennessee prior to statehood. The Civil War Families of Tennessee is an organization of individuals whose ancestors fought in the American Civil War.

== See also ==
- Frank H. McClung Museum
- History of Knoxville, Tennessee
- List of historical societies in Tennessee
