= Uncle Ray's =

Snack food brand

- Product type: Potato chips
- Current owner: H. T. Hackney Company
- Country: United States
- Introduced: 1998
- Markets: United States, Canada
- Previous owners: Amerifoods, Jenkins Foods LLC
- Website: Official website

Uncle Ray’s is the brand name of a line of food products. Established in 1965 by Ray Jenkins and Robert Qualls, the brand's products are produced by Uncle Ray's LLC in Detroit, Michigan. Uncle Ray's LLC (formerly Cabana Foods) specializes in potato chips and other snack foods such as onion rings, pretzels, and cheese curls. From 2016 until 2021, it was the "official potato chip" of Minor League Baseball.

== History ==
=== 1965-1980s ===
The company was founded in 1965 by Ray Jenkins and Robert Qualls as Cabana Foods. Jenkins grew up in Detroit, Michigan in poverty, dropped out of school in eighth grade and took up a job in an iron foundry. He later joined the US Navy, becoming a cook on the USS Bristol. When he returned home, Jenkins decided to open up his own food business. In 1965 he began selling products out of the back seat of his Dodge Dart, partnering with co-founder Robert Qualls. "We had $150, and we started with chip dip. We had a local dairy make the chip dip, and I sold it to taverns, to bowling allies, to little stores, out of the back seat of my car", recalls Jenkins. First products included popcorn, chip dips, and shrimp cocktail sauce.

In 1967, Ray bought 'Cabana,' a pork skins manufacturer, for $1,200 and began selling extruded corn and cheese products. Still operating under the name 'Cabana', Ray purchased a 15,000-square-foot (1,400 m^{2}) facility in Dearborn, Michigan in 1969. In 1983, he continued his expansion and bought the old Superior Potato Chip factory on the west side of Detroit.

=== 1990s-2005 ===
Jenkins and Qualls became involved in a contentious legal battle which ended in the early 1990s, when the two men ended their partnership with Jenkins continuing on as the sole owner of the company. After taking on a significant amount of debt, in 1993, Jenkins sold the business to AmeriFoods and retired.

The company held Cabana Foods for only two years before selling it back to Jenkins, who changed the company name to Jenkins Foods in 1995, and started the "Uncle Ray's" Potato Chip product line, which was officially introduced to the market in 1998. In June 2000, he began to print chapters of his autobiography, The Life and Times of Uncle Ray, onto the chip bags, as well as a moral lesson and bible verse. Jenkins was a Christian; according to him, his belief in God was reinforced after he survived a two-week hospitalization following an episode of vomiting blood. By 2001, Jenkins Foods' had sales of approximately $18 million, with 100 employees at two facilities. By 2004, its chips accounted for 1 percent of sales of chips in drug stores nationally.

=== 2006-2026 ===
In April 2006, Jenkins sold the business to a large privately held company, with Jenkins Foods dissolved as a name. In 2006 it became a wholly-owned subsidiary of H. T. Hackney Company as Uncle Ray's LLC. In 2007, it had 130 employees, and sales of $34.1 million. While around half of its output was for Uncle Ray's products, it also produced products for private labels of companies such as Winn-Dixie. Beyond Michigan convenience stores, Uncle Ray's chips were sold at groceries and chains such as Walgreens, CVS, and Big Lots.

In '14, Detroit Free Press reported that Uncle Ray's, still based in Detroit, manufactured chips at its Birwood Street location in the city. Between 2014 and '16, Uncle Ray's expanded, with 20% growth over that time. In 2016, 175 of its 200 employees worked at its location in west Detroit.

Starting in 2016, Uncle Ray’s entered into a partnership with Minor League Baseball (MiLB) to be its official potato chip, with its products sold at over 70 minor league ballparks. And extension of the deal was signed in 2018, to last three years. In '19, MiLB had an Uncle Ray's Player of the Month Award. Uncle Ray's potato chips at one point were sold in 52 chain stores in all US states except for California, and in Canadian Tire gas stations in Canada.

== Products ==
In 2021, WRKR reported there were 13 varieties of chip. In 2026, Uncle Ray's listed several types of product lines: potato chips, wavy potato chips, tortilla chips, pork rinds, popcorn, pretzels, trail corn, and other types of snacks like onion rings.

== Cultural ==
In 2005, the chips appeared in the film The Upside of Anger, which takes place in Detroit.

== See also ==
- List of brand name snack foods
