= East Tennessee Community Design Center =

American organization

- Founded: July 1, 1970
- Tax ID no.: 501(c)(3)
- Location: 1300 N. Broadway, Knoxville
- Coordinates: 35°57′55″N 83°55′06″W
- Website: http://www.communitydc.org/

The East Tennessee Community Design Center, founded in 1970, is an organization who offers design and planning assistance to communities and organizations throughout 16 counties of East Tennessee. The Community Design Center offers its services through the pro bono contributions of area architects, landscape architects, planners and other professionals. It is located in Knoxville, Tennessee and is registered as a nonprofit corporation chartered as a 501(c)(3) tax-exempt organization under IRS regulations.

== History ==
The Community Design Center has been in existence since 1969, when Bruce McCarty, then the President of the local chapter of the American Institute of Architects (AIA), visited the community design center in Philadelphia. Bruce returned to "pitch the idea" to some 40 local professionals that Knoxville too was in need of a community design center. McCarty founded the ETCDC to offer technical expertise to non-profit organizations. Dozens of professional architects and students from the University of Tennessee donate their time and talent in order to assist charitable groups.

In the beginning, the Community Design Center was a part of a national movement instigated by the American Institute of Architects and the National Urban League. Bruce McCarty was the local instigator. Bruce heard that architects, planners, and other designers in other cities were helping change communities by donating their professional services to low-income communities and groups. Bruce took his son, Doug, and other architecture students to see how it was being done in Philadelphia, location of one of the first Community Design Centers. Back home in Knoxville, Tennessee, Bruce led a local coalition of planners, community organizers, social workers, architects, and landscape architects in formation of the East Tennessee Community Design Center. On July 1, 1970, the center was incorporated for one purpose, to bring professional design and planning services to non-profit groups and agencies that lack the resources to pay for the service. By 1971, there were at least 83 such programs across the country.

The first project of the Community Design Center was a neighborhood plan for Fort Sanders, funded through the East Tennessee Development District, using a Housing and Urban Development grant intended to assist grassroots planning. Members of the first Board of Directors, with their own hands, rehabilitated the Design Center's historic home in Knoxville. These early board members also organized a process for accepting and assisting new projects, provided planning and design assistance to the Fort Sanders study, and recruited their colleagues to help with the additional project requests that began to pour in.

== Mission ==
The mission statement given by the East Tennessee Community Design Center is "to make East Tennessee a better place to live and work by bringing professional design and planning assistance to community groups and non-profit organizations."

== Executive Directors ==
- Ellie Kittrell (2026–present)
- L. Duane Grieve FAIA (2018–2026)
- Wayne Blasius (2015–2018)
- Mary Linda Schwarzbart (2013–2015)
- John C. Merino (2013-2013)
- David Watson (2002–2013)
- Tim Ledford (1996–2001)
- Terry Shupp (1995–1996)
- Annette Anderson (1973–1995)
- Bill Oliphant (1971–1973)
- Ed Dusek (1970–1971)

The first Coordinator of the Community Design Center was Ed Dusek, an architect from Nashville, Tennessee, who led the Center through the completion of the Fort Sanders plan. His successor was landscape architect Bill Oliphant, one of the center's founders. Oliphant brought the first VISTA's to the Center in 1972. Those "Knoxville Nine" were the first of many VISTA's who served East Tennessee and their own career development by their work on Community Design Center projects. The Community Design Center hosted the longest lasting Americorps VISTA program in the country. Annette Anderson began her 22-year tenure as the Coordinator of the Center in 1973 and remained the director until 1995.

=== Staff ===
The center has an all-volunteer board of directors and a small staff of two full-time personnel, the executive director and the assistant to the director. Part-time staff includes an administrative assistant, a studio director and a DesignWorks program coordinator, along with a variable number of paid students primarily from The University of Tennessee College of Architecture and Design.

== Services ==
The majority of assistance provided by the East Tennessee Community Design Center is architectural and engineering services to nonprofit groups whose projects serve the community at large. Early design support leads to complete projects. The main types of projects that the staff works are community facilities, long range visioning and planning, landscaping, parks and playgrounds, as well as rehabilitation and reuse.

Some of the services provided are:

- Introducing the client to Crime Prevention through Environmental Design (CPTED)
- Introducing the client to sustainable design
- Anticipating project implementation costs
- Evaluating existing building conditions
- Identifying health, safety, and accessibility issues
- Establishing project implementation priorities
- Understanding space needs of the client and transforming those needs into a building design
- Exploring design options
- Containing project costs through design alternatives
- Graphically illustrate how the project will look when construction or renovation is complete

== Funding ==
Funding to sustain the operations is solely from competitive grants and donations from corporate sponsors and individuals in the community. The East Tennessee Community Design Center does request a donation from their clients as well, which is used to help offset the cost associated with providing the design assistance. Funding for preliminary design services is hard to find. The Design Center fills this gap by providing conceptual only architectural and engineering services to community groups and nonprofit organizations early in the project development process.

== See also ==
- Bruce McCarty
