= Bruce McCarty =

American architect (1920–2013)

- Born: December 28, 1920; South Bend, Indiana, United States
- Died: January 5, 2013 (aged 92); Knoxville, Tennessee
- Education: Princeton University and the University of Michigan
- Occupation: Architect
- Style: Modern
- Spouse: Elizabeth Hayes McCarty
- Children: Bruce Hayes McCarty, Douglas Hayes McCarty, and Sarah Elizabeth McCarty

Bruce McCarty, FAIA (December 28, 1920 – January 5, 2013) was an American architect, founder and senior designer (retired 2010) at McCarty Holsaple McCarty Architects of Knoxville, Tennessee. During a career that spanned more than a half-century, he designed some of the city's iconic landmarks, and was the city's most dedicated champion of Modern architecture. Buildings designed or co-designed by McCarty include the Lawson McGhee Library, Knoxville City County Building, University of Tennessee Humanities Complex, Clarence Brown Theatre, and University of Tennessee Art and Architecture Building. McCarty was also the Master Architect for the 1982 World's Fair.

== Biography ==
=== Early life ===
McCarty was born in South Bend, Indiana, the third of four sons to Earl H. and Hazel B. McCarty. Bruce McCarty was raised in Kenosha and Lake Geneva, Wisconsin. Earl McCarty was president of the Nash Motor Company during the 1930s.

McCarty attended Princeton University in the early 1940s, where he studied sculpture under noted sculptor and boxer, Joe Brown. Following the outbreak of World War II, he left Princeton and joined the US Army Air Force. He first arrived in Knoxville for military training in 1943, and was later stationed in California as a P-38 pilot. On April 5, 1945, McCarty married Julia Elizabeth Hayes of Knoxville in Santa Rosa, California. They have three children; Bruce Hayes McCarty, Sarah Elizabeth McCarty, and Douglas Hayes McCarty.

=== Career ===
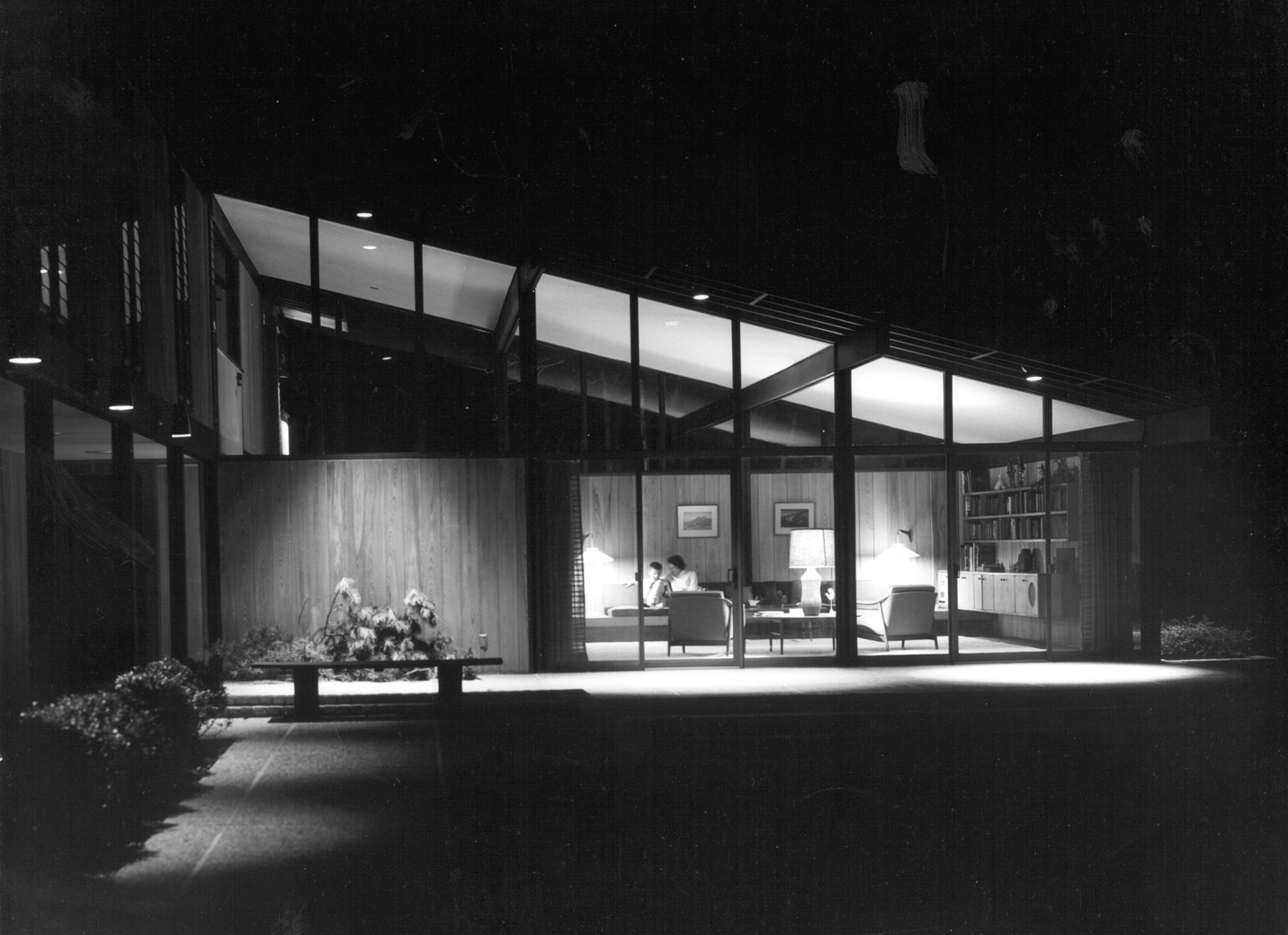
Home of Elizabeth and Bruce McCarty, Knoxville

Following the war, McCarty worked as a draftsman at the Knoxville architectural firm, Barber & McMurry. He earned a BA from Princeton upon returning from the war in 1946. From 1947 to 1949, McCarty attended the University of Michigan and earned a Bachelor of Architecture Degree. During this period, he became enamoured with Modern architecture, especially the work of Frank Lloyd Wright. He, Elizabeth, and son Hayes spent several weeks during 1948 driving around Michigan and Wisconsin, seeking out houses designed by Wright. He also attended Wright's lectures, and visited Wright's home, Taliesin. His other influences included Edward Durrell Stone, I.M. Pei, and Louis Kahn.

Following graduation, McCarty returned to Knoxville to work as a designer and draftsman for the firm Rutherford and Painter (later Painter and Weeks). McCarty became a partner in the firm in the mid-1950s. In 1953, McCarty designed a concrete house, sponsored by Southern Cast Stone and published in several national magazines. This led to several new clients involved in post-war medium priced housing, including the National Broadcasting Company, the Hotpoint Company, Union Carbide, Knox Homes, and the Zeckendorf Corporation. During the 1950s and 60s, the firm also designed a number of custom houses, in addition to commercial and public projects such as the Knoxville Civic Auditorium and Coliseum (in joint venture with Morton/Sweetser) and the Humanities Social Sciences Complex at the University of Tennessee.

In 1965, McCarty and Robert Holsaple formed Bruce McCarty and Associates. In the following five years, the firm designed the Mountain View Garages, Broadway Baptist and Westminster Churches, Virgin Islands St. Croix Condominiums, the University of Tennessee Clarence Brown Theatre, and the University of Tennessee Administration Building.

In 1970, McCarty and Associates merged with another Knoxville architectural firm to form McCarty Bullock Church and Holsaple. Partner Robert Church died in 1972 while serving as acting dean of the University of Tennessee School of Architecture, and the firm thus became McCarty Bullock Holsaple (MBH). MBH designed notable buildings such as the Knoxville City-County Building (a joint venture with Lindsay & Maples), and the UT Art and Architecture Building (co-designed by Bruce and Doug McCarty), the latter design chosen in a statewide competition over 53 other submissions.

McCarty was chosen to be the Master Architect for the 1982 World's Fair, and his firm was not only responsible for the projects's overall design, but also designed many of the buildings, including the Tennessee Amphitheater, Holiday Inn, 1982 Convention Center, and the adjacent office building. Following partner Glenn Bullock's resignation in 1983, Bruce's son, Doug, who had been working with the firm since the mid-1970s, became president, and the firm changed its name to McCarty Holsaple McCarty. Under Doug's leadership, the firm's work over the subsequent two decades included UT's Hodges Library and law school, the 14-story Bank of America Building, the Ijams Nature Center visitor center, and the Knoxville Convention Center. The firm also oversaw planning for Knoxville's waterfront, and designed expansions for Neyland Stadium and McGhee Tyson Airport. McCarty Holsaple McCarty provided the renovation plans for the Tennessee Theatre, completed in 2006.

== Legacy and recognition ==
In 1965, McCarty helped establish the University of Tennessee's College of Architecture. The school has since named the auditorium in its Art and Architecture Building for the McCarty family. McCarty was also instrumental in the establishment of the East Tennessee Community Design Center, which advises communities in the region on appearance and functionality.

=== Honors ===
- 1959 Certificate of Award for Outstanding Civic Activities from Gulf State AIA
- 1964–68 Member of Chamber of Commerce Board (Knoxville TN)
- 1964–74 Trustee of Dulin Art Gallery (Knoxville TN)
- 1965–70 Board of Metropolitan Planning Commission (Knoxville TN)
- 1969 Fellowship in AIA at Convention in Chicago
- 1970 President of East Tennessee Chapter AIA
- 1970–90 Who's Who in the United States
- 1970 Proposes formation of the Community Design Center
- 1975 Receives Mayor's Award for Outstanding Support of the Arts
- 1975 Firm wins statewide competition for the design of the Art & Architecture Building at the University of Tennessee. Bruce & Doug McCarty; Co-designers
- 1982 McCarty Bullock Holsaple receives Mayor's Award for 1982 World's Fair
- 1982 President of Tennessee Society of Architects
- 1996 Gold Medal from East Tennessee Chapter AIA
- 2000 Volunteer of the Year Award from the University of Tennessee
- 2004 Exhibition of the Architecture of Bruce McCarty at the University of Tennessee Ewing Gallery
- 2011 Silver Medal from the University of Tennessee Faculty and Tau Sigma Delta of the College of Architecture and Design

== Major works ==
Designed by Painter, Weeks, and McCarty

Designed by Bruce McCarty & Associates (1965–1970)

Designed by McCarty Bullock Church Holsaple (1970–1972) or McCarty Bullock Holsaple (1972–1984)

Designed by McCarty Holsaple McCarty (1984–present)

Name	Location	Completed	Status	Other information	Image	Reference
Tom and Betty Kesterson Residence	Knoxville, Tennessee	1951	Standing			
Bruce and Elizabeth McCarty Residence (Cherokee Blvd.)	Knoxville, Tennessee	1952	Altered			
Mrs. E. H. McCarty Residence	Pittman Center, Tennessee	1952	Standing			
Concrete House (Stockton Dr.)	Knoxville, Tennessee	1953	Standing	Modern house in West Hills		
Harkness House	Knoxville, Tennessee	1953	Standing	Modern house in West Hills		
Bon Air	Gatlinburg, Tennessee	1954	Altered			
Hotpoint Living-Conditioned House (West Hills Rd.)	Knoxville, Tennessee	1954	Altered	Designed as a demonstration home for a Living for Young Homemakers promotional campaign; listed on the National Register of Historic Places in 2010		
NBC House (Royalview Rd)	Knoxville, Tennessee	1957	Standing	Modern house in Cumberland Estates. Slated to be featured on NBC's "The House That Home Built," but never aired		
George Bridges Residence (Lakemore Hills)	Knoxville, Tennessee	1958	Standing			
Tennessee Valley Branch Bank	Knoxville, Tennessee	1958	Altered			
Bruce and Elizabeth McCarty Residence (Lyons View Pk.)	Knoxville, Tennessee	1958	Standing			
NAHB Research House (Crestfield Rd)	Knoxville, Tennessee	1959	Standing	Modern house in Cumberland Estates		
Steve Wing Residence (Lakemore Hills)	Knoxville, Tennessee	1959	Altered			
Ralph Brooks Residence	Knoxville, Tennessee	1962	Altered			
Arnold Kramer Residence (Lakemore Hills)	Knoxville, Tennessee	1963	Standing			
Mrs. E. H. McCarty Residence	Winter Park, Florida	1963	Standing			
Charles Davis Residence (Holston Hills)	Knoxville, Tennessee	1960	Standing			
Wilson Residence (West Hills)	Knoxville, Tennessee	1964	Altered			
Pedestrian Bridge (University of Tennessee)	Knoxville, Tennessee	1966	Standing			
Westminster Presbyterian Church (Northshore Dr.)	Knoxville, Tennessee	1966	Standing			
Harry Brooks Residence (Brookhaven Farms)	Knoxville, Tennessee	1967	Standing			
James White Civic Coliseum	Knoxville, Tennessee	1967	Standing			
Humanities Building (University of Tennessee)	Knoxville, Tennessee	1969	Standing			
Clarence Brown Theatre (University of Tennessee)	Knoxville, Tennessee	1970	Standing			
Lawson McGhee Library	Knoxville, Tennessee	1970	Standing			
Reef Condominiums	St. Croix, U.S. Virgin Islands	1968	Standing			
Veterinary Hospital (University of Tennessee)	Knoxville, Tennessee	1976	Standing			
TVA Towers	Knoxville, Tennessee	1978	Standing			
City-County Building	Knoxville, Tennessee	1979	Standing			
Art and Architecture Building (University of Tennessee)	Knoxville, Tennessee	1981	Standing			
1982 World's Fair Master Plan	Knoxville, Tennessee	1982	Altered	McCarty's firm also designed the Tennessee Amphitheater		
Hodges Library (University of Tennessee)	Knoxville, Tennessee	1987	Standing	With Lindsay & Maples Architects and Cooper & Perry Architects		
Bank of America Building	Knoxville, Tennessee	1990	Standing			
Ijams Nature Center	Knoxville, Tennessee	1991	Standing			
McGhee Tyson Airport (expansion)	Blount County, Tennessee	1998	Standing	With HNTB Architects		
Knoxville Convention Center	Knoxville, Tennessee	2002	Standing	With Thompson, Ventulett, Stainback & Associates Architects		
Tennessee Theatre (renovation)	Knoxville, Tennessee	2006	Standing	Theatre constructed in 1928; with Westlake Reed Leskosky Architects		

== See also ==
- Baumann family (architects)
- R. F. Graf
