= H. T. Hackney Company =

American wholesale grocery distributor

The H.T. Hackney Co.
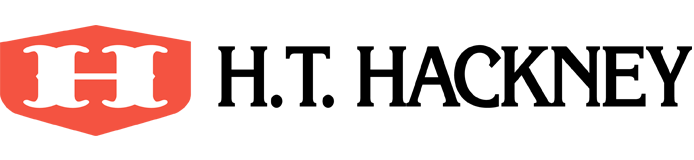
- Company type: Privately held company
- Industry: Wholesale
- Founded: 1891
- Founder: Henry Tate Hackney
- Headquarters: Knoxville, Tennessee, United States
- Area served: Eastern United States
- Key people: William Sansom (Chairman and CEO), Michael Morton (CFO and Vice President), Leonard Robinette (Vice President of Administration), Kathryn Eggleston (Director)
- Products: Grocery items, snack foods, tobacco products, oil, beverages
- Revenue: ▲US$5.9 billion(FY 2019)
- Number of employees: 4,200
- Subsidiaries: Holland House Furniture; Natural Springs Water Group, LLC; Uncle Ray's; Great American Deli; Neuro Fuel; Family Brands
- Website: www.hthackney.com

The H. T. Hackney Company is an American wholesale grocery distribution firm headquartered in Knoxville, Tennessee. Founded in 1891, the company has grown over the years to become one of the largest grocery wholesalers in the nation, with operations covering much of the Eastern United States. H. T. Hackney employs over 4,000 people, and distributes over 40,000 different items to over 20,000 locations in 21 states. Its current chairman and CEO is William B. Sansom. Current VP and CFO is Michael D. Morton.

== History ==
The H. T. Hackney Company is rooted in a feed and grain business established by Henry Tate Hackney and W. C. Everett in 1887, which operated out of a stall on Market Square in Knoxville. In 1891, Hackney bought Everett's stake, and overhauled the company into a full-scale jobbing house. The company thrived during the 1890s amidst Knoxville's late-19th century economic boom, which saw the city's wholesaling sector grow to become the third largest in the South. H. T. Hackney was just one of more than 50 wholesaling companies operating in the city during this period.

The H. T. Hackney Company incorporated on October 1, 1897. Following Henry Tate Hackney's death in 1899, his brother-in-law, Benjamin Morton (1875–1952), became president of the company. In 1905, H. T. Hackney merged with a powerful Knoxville wholesaler, M. L. Ross and Company, which was then under control of William Cary Ross, the son of M. L. Ross and a friend of Morton. In subsequent years, Morton, Ross, and iron manufacturer Hugh Sanford formed an influential triumvirate known as "The Three Musketeers", which controlled a significant portion of the city's business activity in the 1910s and 1920s. Morton served as Mayor of Knoxville from 1923 to 1927.

Under Morton's leadership, H. T. Hackney continued to expand its holdings. At one point, the company operated coal mines at Jellico and an automobile subsidiary, The H. T. Hackney Vehicle Company, and distributed products such as candy, blasting powder, industrial equipment, furniture, oil, produce, and saddles. This diversification helped the company survive the collapse of Knoxville's wholesaling sector, which brought the closures of numerous decades-old firms such as Cowan, McClung and Company.

Morton was succeeded by his son, Julian, who ran the company until his death in 1972. C. E. Harris, a long-time associate of the Mortons, was Chairman and CEO of H. T. Hackney from 1972 until 1982. In 1975, under Harris's leadership, the company greatly expanded its sales volume with the acquisition of the Jellico Grocery Company, which owned warehouses in Harlan, Middlesboro, Somerset and Corbin in Kentucky, and Oneida and Elizabethton in Tennessee.

Bill Sansom has been Chairman and CEO of H. T. Hackney since 1983. During his tenure, the company has continued to expand, acquiring two subsidiaries, furniture maker Holland House and bottled water manufacturer Natural Springs Water. In 2003, the company purchased two convenience store distribution subsidiaries – L&L Jiroch Company and J. F. Walker Company – from the Michigan-based wholesaler Spartan Stores. In 2005, H. T. Hackney closed its Knoxville warehouse and moved its Knoxville-area distribution operations to a new 300,000-square-foot facility located along Interstate 40 in adjacent Roane County, though the company is still headquartered at the Fidelity Building in Downtown Knoxville.

On August 30, 2011, H. T. Hackney hired former University of Tennessee basketball coach Bruce Pearl as its Vice President of Marketing.

In September 2011, H. T. Hackney launched a new furniture manufacturing subsidiary, H.Home. This new subsidiary operates factories in Bean Station, Tennessee, and Athens, Tennessee, and its products include upholstery, living room furniture, recliners, and sofas.

== Products and services ==
The H. T. Hackney Company distributes over 30,000 different products to over 20,000 retail locations in 21 states. Products include frozen food, baked goods, candy, snack foods, tobacco, cosmetics, and deli items, and its major trading partners include General Mills, Kraft, Valvoline, Procter & Gamble, and Kellogg's.

Retailers serviced by H. T. Hackney include convenience stores, drug stores, travel centers, and small grocery stores. The company distributes products through a network of 28 distribution centers across 10 states, ranging as far north as Grand Rapids, Michigan, and as far south as Miami, Florida.

== Subsidiaries ==
The company's subsidiaries include Indianapolis-based Holland House Furniture which manufactures dining room suites, bedroom furniture, and rocking chairs, Johnson City-based Natural Springs Water which produces bottled water, and Detroit-based Uncle Ray's snack foods.

== Financial information ==
In 2019, H. T. Hackney had $5 billion in estimated sales. According to Forbes, it is the nation's 36th-largest privately held company.
