= Carson Brewer =

American journalist (1920–2003)

Carson Brewer (February 2, 1920 – January 15, 2003) was an American journalist and conservationist, best known for his work documenting the folk life of Knoxville and the surrounding Appalachian communities in East Tennessee. During his 40-year career as a columnist for the Knoxville News-Sentinel, Brewer was a key voice for the promotion and protection of the region's natural wonders, especially the Great Smoky Mountains. His historical work included the first extensive history of the Little Tennessee River valley and one of the first comprehensive histories of the Tennessee Valley Authority.

Brewer was born in Hancock County, Tennessee in 1920, the son of a local postmaster. He attended Maryville College for two years before joining the U.S. Army in 1941 at the outbreak of World War II. After the war, Brewer attended the University of Tennessee, but due to illness, he never obtained a degree. He joined the staff of the News-Sentinel in 1945, and in 1948 he married pioneering female journalist Alberta Trulock (1917—2007).

Brewer wrote several books on the Great Smoky Mountains, most notably Hiking in the Great Smoky Mountains (1962), which was reprinted several times over three decades. In 1969, the Tennessee Valley Authority— which was planning to flood the Little Tennessee River valley by constructing Tellico Dam at the river's mouth— hired Brewer and his wife Alberta to compile a history of the valley and its inhabitants. Their work was published by the East Tennessee Historical Society in 1975 under the title, Valley So Wild: A Folk History. In the early 1980s, Brewer wrote a series of articles documenting the history of the Tennessee Valley Authority and its effects on the inhabitants of East Tennessee. He retired from the News-Sentinel in 1985, but continued writing until his death in 2003.
