= McClung Museum of Natural History and Culture =

Museum in Tennessee, United States

Coordinates: 35.951999°N 83.927178°W

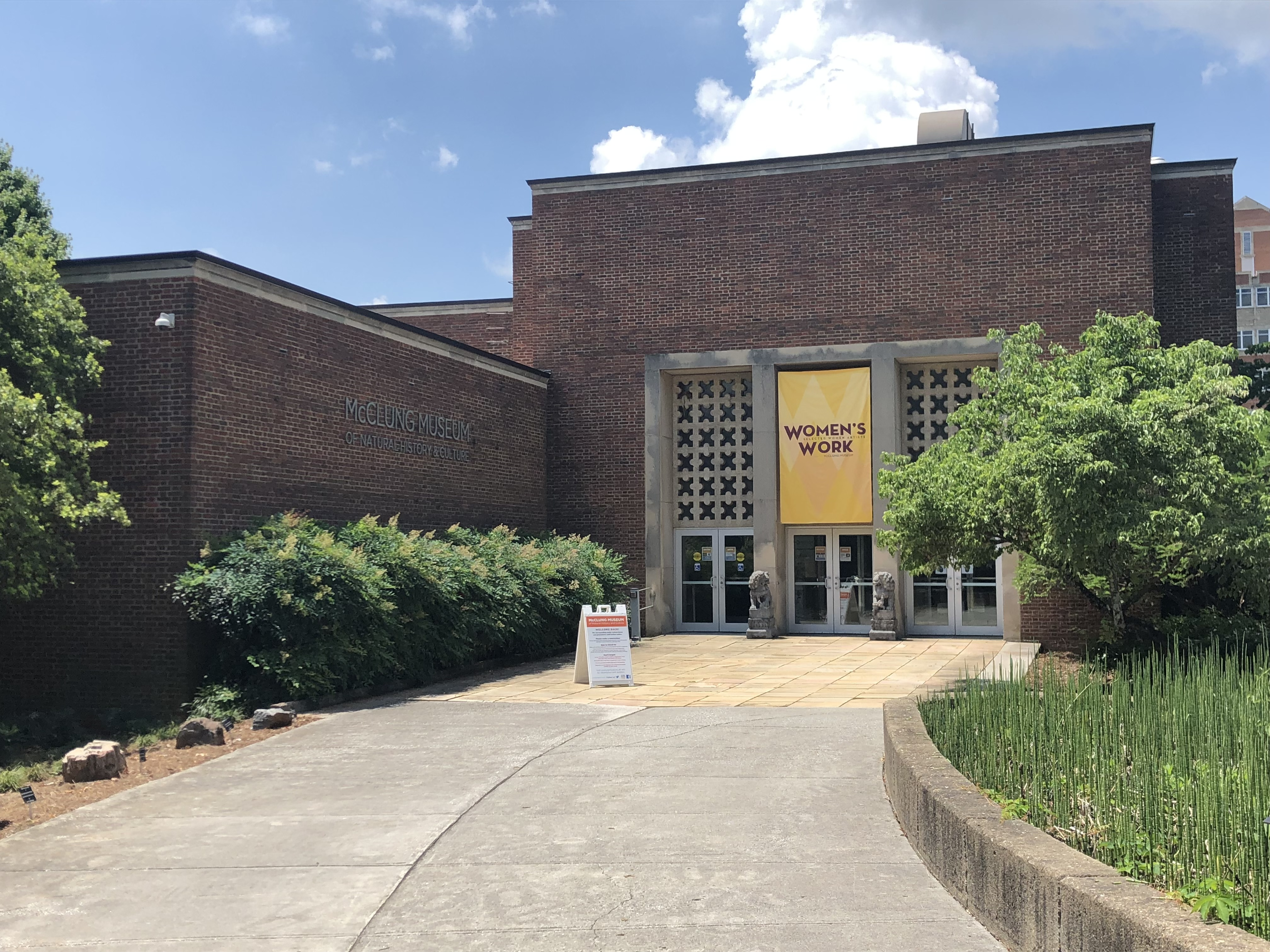
- The McClung Museum on the University of Tennessee campus in June 2021.
- Established: 1963
- Location: University of Tennessee, Knoxville
- Type: Natural history and culture
- Accreditation: American Alliance of Museums
- Collection size: Natural history, archaeology, anthropology, decorative arts, local history
- Website: McClung Museum Homepage

The McClung Museum of Natural History and Culture is a museum located on the campus of the University of Tennessee in Knoxville. Built in 1963, exhibits focus on natural history, archaeology, anthropology, decorative arts, and local history.

Long-term exhibits include:

- The Decorative Experience — A collection of art from various times and cultures from around the world.
- Geology and Fossil History of East Tennessee — A collection of Tennessee fossils representing a comprehensive overview of geological history. Outside of the main building, the museum's most prominent and popular exhibit is a replica of an Edmontosaurus annectens, nicknamed "Monty" by the students at the University of Tennessee.
- Human Origins: Searching for Our Fossil Ancestors — A concise overview of the current scientific understanding regarding human evolution.
- Tennessee Freshwater Mussels — A collection displaying the incredible diversity of freshwater pearl mussels in Tennessee.

In addition, the McClung Museum houses special exhibitions that temporarily showcase art or artifacts from other collections or institutions. The McClung Museum is accredited by the American Alliance of Museums and is an affiliate of the Smithsonian Institution.

== See also ==
- East Tennessee Historical Society
