= Warren Dockter =

American author and historian (born 1982)

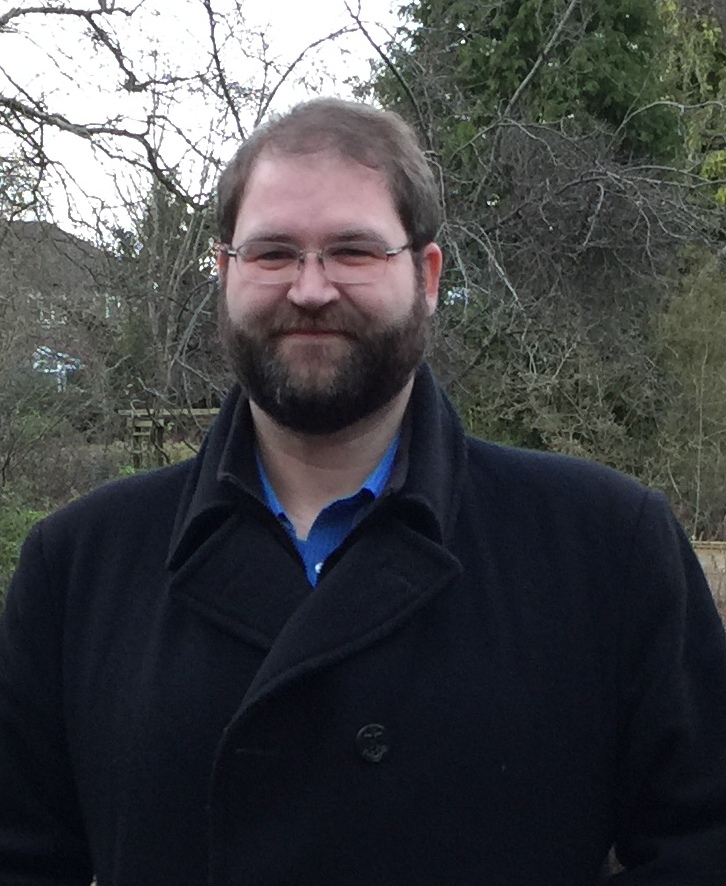

Warren Dockter (born 1982) is an author and historian. He was a Research Fellow at Clare Hall, University of Cambridge and a lecturer at Aberystwyth University in International Politics.

Dockter is a former member of the council of the British Institute at Ankara. Dockter now serves as the president and CEO of the East Tennessee Historical Society in Knoxville, TN.

== Biography ==
Warren Dockter is a graduate of the University of Tennessee and gained his PhD at the University of Nottingham. His book Churchill and the Islamic World: Orientalism, Empire and Diplomacy in the Middle East (2015) challenged notions surrounding Winston Churchill's Islamophobia. According to Dockter, Churchill's often quoted criticism of Islam was written during a time of a fundamentalist revolt in Sudan and this statement does not reflect his full views of Islam as a religion, which were "often paradoxical and complex." He could be critical but at times "romanticized" the Islamic world; he exhibited great "respect, understanding and magnanimity." Churchill had a fascination of Islam and Islamic civilization. Winston Churchill's future sister-in-law expressed concerns about his fascination by stating, "[p]lease don't become converted to Islam; I have noticed in your disposition a tendency to orientalism." However, Dockter also asserted that Churchill "never seriously considered converting" to Islam.

Dockter worked with Boris Johnson as his research assistant for the book The Churchill Factor: How One Man made History. He was not credited, but was thanked in its acknowledgments.

== Publications ==
- Holt, Andrew; Dockter, Warren (2017), Private Secretaries to the Prime Minister : Foreign Affairs from Churchill to Thatcher, Routledge Studies in Modern British History, 20., Abingdon, Oxon, ISBN 978-1409441809
- Dockter, Warren (2015), Churchill and the Islamic World : Orientalism, Empire and Diplomacy in the Middle East, I. B. Tauris, ISBN 978-1780768182
- Dockter, Warren (2015), Winston Churchill at the Telegraph, Aurum Press, ISBN 978-1781314524
