= Norwood, Knoxville =

Neighborhood in Knoxville, Tennessee

Coordinates: 36.004°N 83.982°W

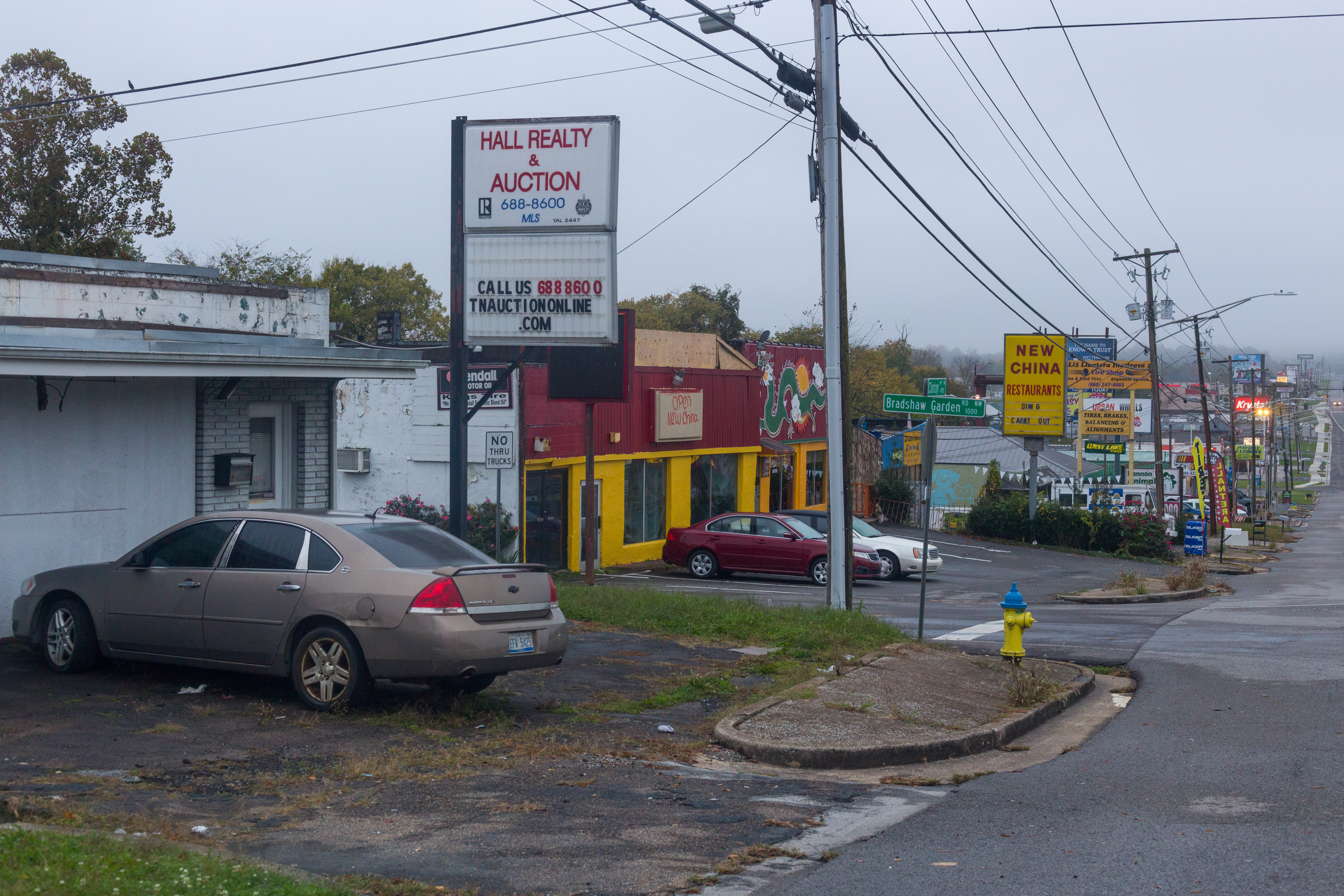
Clinton Highway in Norwood, Knoxville

Norwood is a neighborhood in Knoxville, Tennessee. It is located in an area north and west of Interstate 75, north of Interstate 640, east of Western Avenue, and south of Schaad Road and Callahan Drive.

Its ZIP codes are 37912 and 37921.
