= Old City Hall (Knoxville) =

- Old Knoxville City Hall
- U.S. National Register of Historic Places
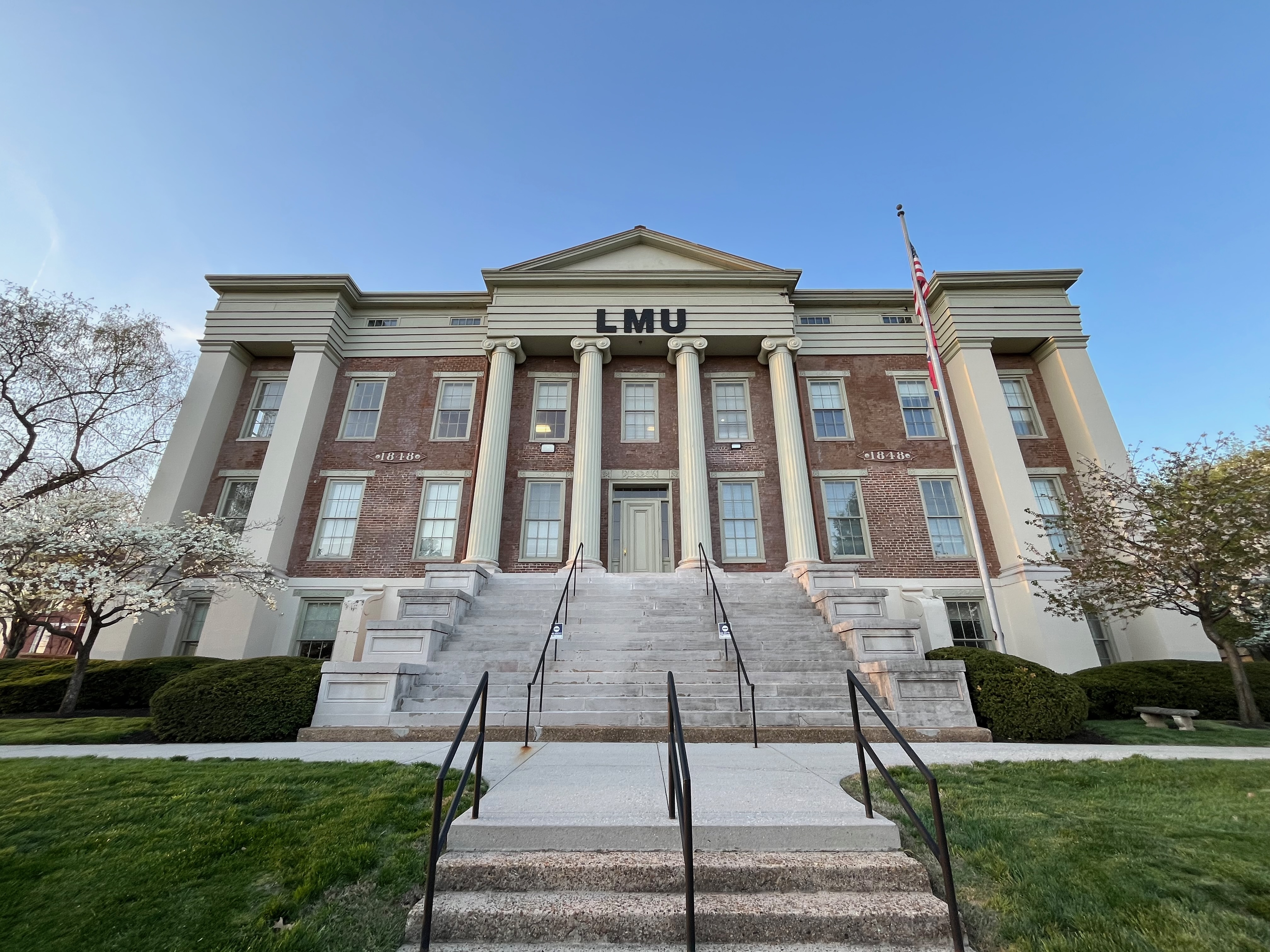
- The main building in 2025, in use as a Lincoln Memorial University campus
- Location: Summit Hill Drive; Knoxville, Tennessee
- Coordinates: 35°57′55″N 83°55′24″W
- Architectural style: Greek Revival
- NRHP reference No.: 72001241
- Added to NRHP: May 31, 1972

Old City Hall is a complex of historic buildings located at 601 West Summit Hill Drive in Knoxville, Tennessee, United States. Originally constructed in 1848 as the Tennessee School for the Deaf and Dumb (now the Tennessee School for the Deaf), the complex served as Knoxville's city hall from 1925 until 1980. The complex has been listed on the National Register of Historic Places and has been documented by the Historic American Buildings Survey. It currently houses Lincoln Memorial University's Duncan School of Law.

== Design ==
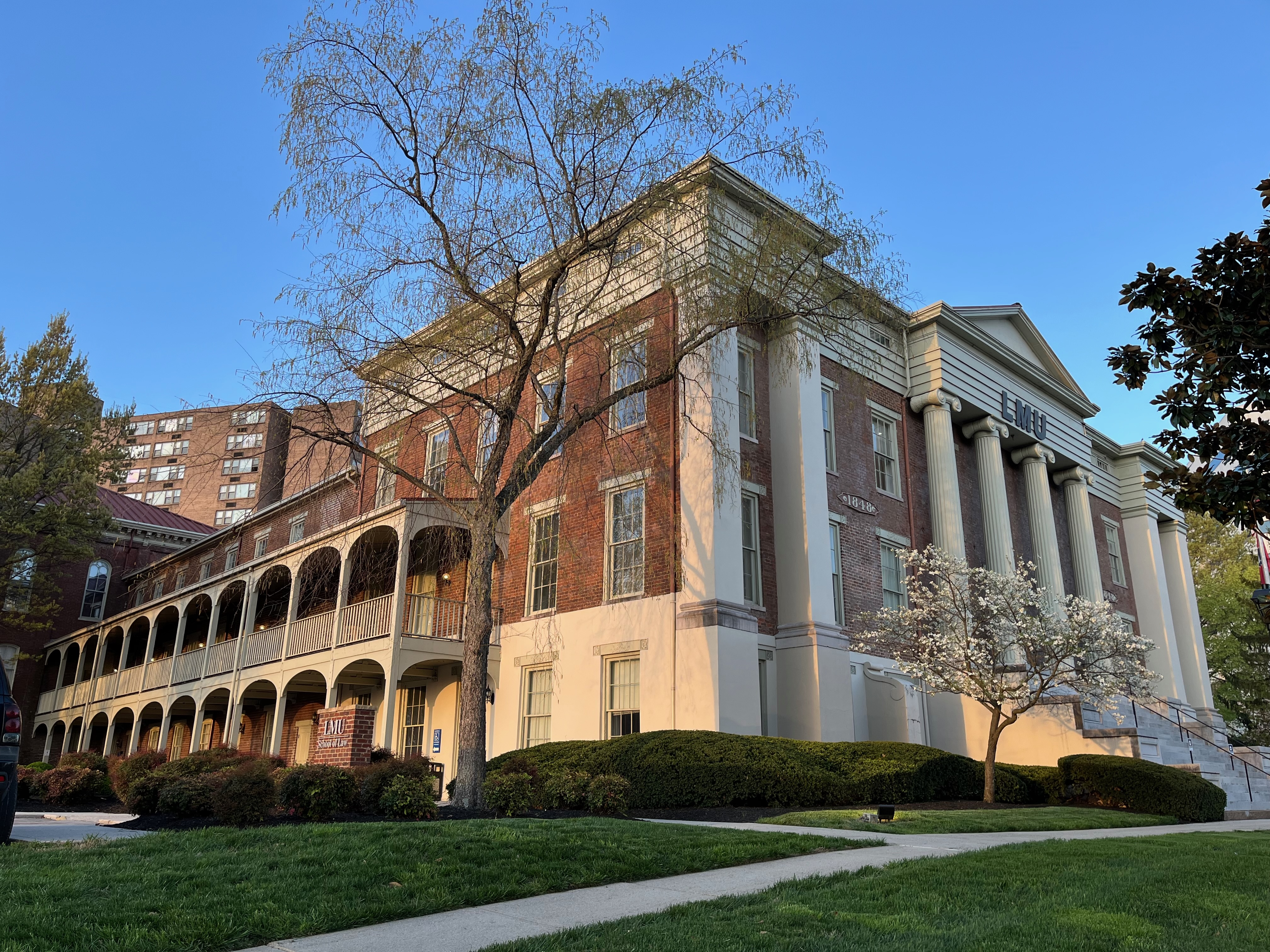
Side view in 2025

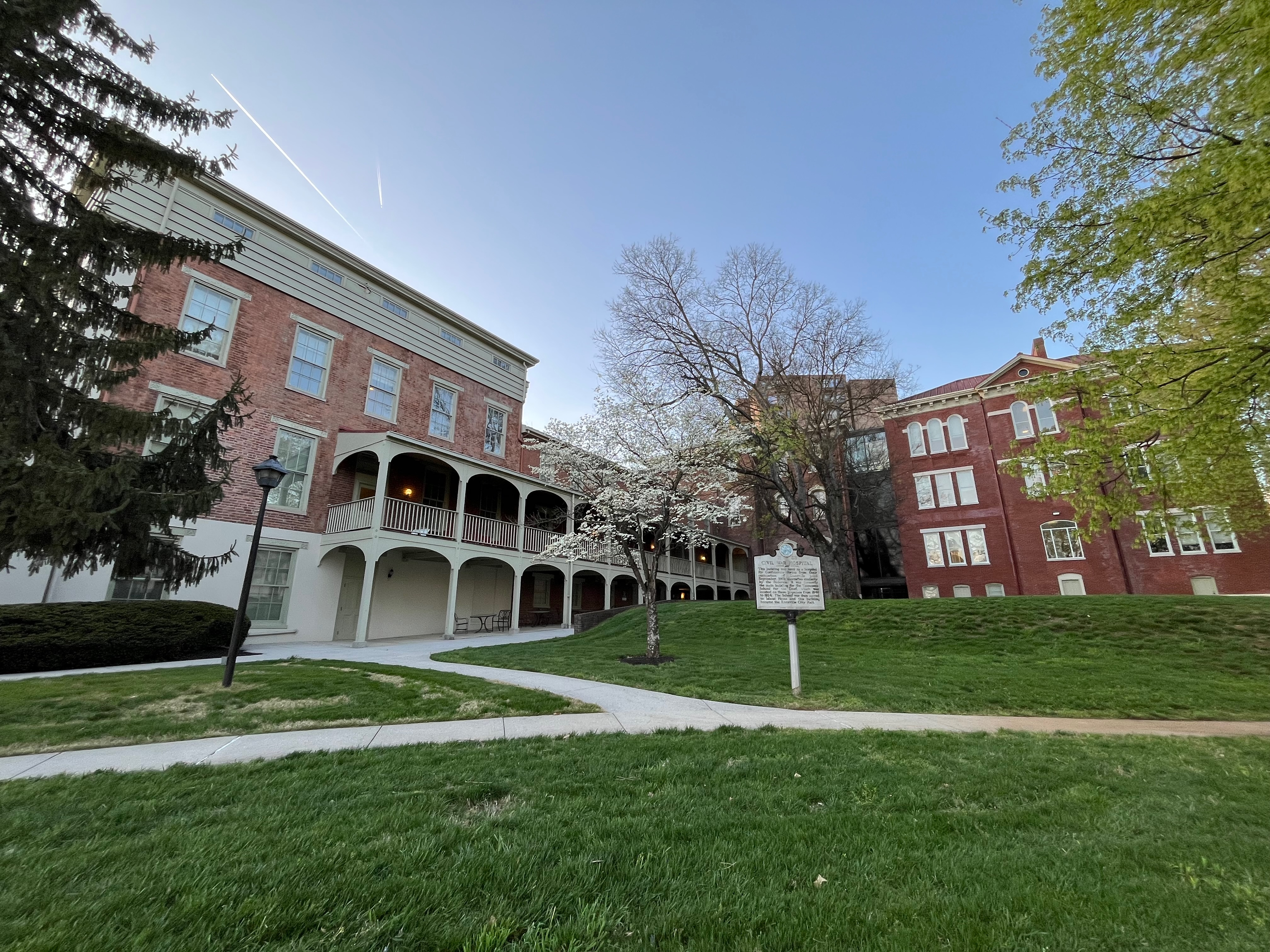
Annex buildings in 2025

The Old City Hall complex stands at the northeast corner of the intersection of Summit Hill Drive, Western Avenue, Broadway, and Henley Street. The L&N Station stands opposite this intersection to the southwest. The complex consists of five interconnected buildings— the three-story main building, completed in 1848, and four additions behind the main building, built between 1874 and 1899. The entire complex sits atop a wooded knoll. The buildings' interiors have been modified extensively over the years as the role of the complex changed.

The main building consists of a three-story front section measuring 100 feet (30 m) by 50 feet (15 m), and two rear wings, each measuring 25 feet (7.6 m) by 79 feet (24 m), giving the building a U-shape. The facade of the central section contains a portico with four Ionic columns supporting a large pediment, and accessed by a marble staircase. One of the rear additions was designed in the Italian Renaissance style, and another contains Neoclassical elements.

== History ==
=== Tennessee School for the Deaf ===
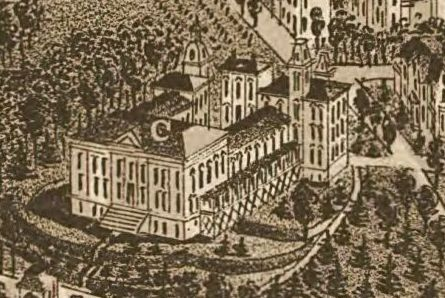
The "Deaf and Dumb Asylum," as shown on an 1886 map of Knoxville

The Tennessee School for the Deaf, originally called the Tennessee School for the Deaf and Dumb, or the "Deaf and Dumb Asylum," was authorized by the state in 1844, following legislative efforts initiated by state senator John Cocke of Grainger County. Knoxville merchant Calvin Morgan (1773—1851) donated the property for the school, and construction began in 1846. Jacob Newman oversaw the building's construction, and was probably the building's architect. St. John's Episcopal rector Thomas William Humes delivered the dedicatory address upon the school's opening in 1848.

The school's enrollment grew rapidly during the 1850s, but was forced to close at the outset of the Civil War, when occupying Confederate forces converted it into a hospital. Following William P. Sanders's failed raid against the city in June 1863, an artillery battery was set up behind the school building. When Union forces captured Knoxville in September 1863, they in turn used the school as a hospital. The school finally reopened in December 1866.

In 1873, the state appropriated $10,000 for the school, allowing it to expand. A new classroom building, designed by early Knoxville architect A.C. Bruce, was completed in 1874, and a chapel and auditorium building, designed by Joseph Baumann (1844–1920), was completed in 1879. A second classroom building was added in 1891, and a hospital building was constructed in 1899. The school continued operating at the complex until 1924, when it moved to its new campus at the old Island Home estate in South Knoxville.

=== City Hall ===
Knoxville's first city hall was a small, two-story building constructed on the northern half of Market Square in 1868 (prior to this, the city government met at the Knox County Courthouse). This structure was replaced by a larger, more elaborate building in 1888. This second building was incorporated into the design of the new market house, which was completed in 1897, though the city's government still met on its second floor.

In 1923, at the behest of progressive new city manager Louis Brownlow, Knoxville purchased the Tennessee School for the Deaf complex for use as a city hall. The city council held its first meeting in the building in February 1925, and in subsequent decades the building thus played a key role in Knoxville's development. Reminiscing about the building, local historian Jack Neely stated, "lots of major decisions were made within these walls, as the city desegregated, fluoridated its water, and first contemplated a World’s Fair." Over several decades, figures such as Cas Walker, George Dempster and John Duncan, Sr., fought over issues ranging from taxation to the city's lack of parking spaces.

In 1924, the Boyd school (located where the Daylight Building now stands) burned down. During the early 1930s, the city made plans to move the school into the City Hall complex, but as the city's offices expanded and required more and more space, these plans never materialized.

In his 1957 Pulitzer Prize-winning novel, A Death in the Family, author James Agee recalled walking with his father through downtown Knoxville in 1915. As they passed the "deaf and dumb asylum," Agee noted how "its windows showed black in its pale brick, as the nursing woman's eyes, and it stood deep and silent among the light shadows of its trees."

=== Recent history ===
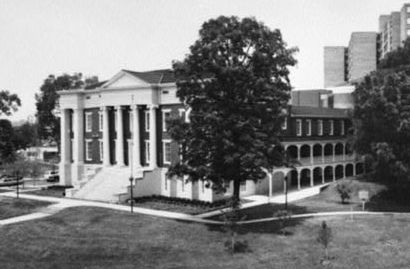
Old City Hall, from a 1983 HABS photograph

Over the second half of the 20th century, the Old City Hall lot, which originally covered 8 acres (3.2 ha), was gradually chipped away by development and road work. During the 1950s, several buildings on the northern half of the lot were demolished to make way for a new parking lot. In 1975, a cottage was demolished on the southwestern corner of the lot, and three years later, the Summit Hill Towers were erected on the lot's northeastern portion.

In 1980, the City of Knoxville relocated its main offices, including its city hall functions, to the newly completed City-County Building on Main Street. Various tenants occupied Old City Hall in subsequent years, including the Knoxville Area Chamber Partnership (which moved to Market Square in 2004). In February 2008, Harrogate-based Lincoln Memorial University began leasing the building for its new law school, the Duncan School of Law.

== See also ==
- List of mayors of Knoxville, Tennessee
- Customs House, Knoxville
- History of Knoxville, Tennessee
- Knox County Courthouse (Tennessee)
- United States Post Office and Courthouse (Knoxville, Tennessee)
