= Knoxville City-County Building =

Government building in Knoxville, TN, USA

Coordinates: 35.9609°N 83.9165°W

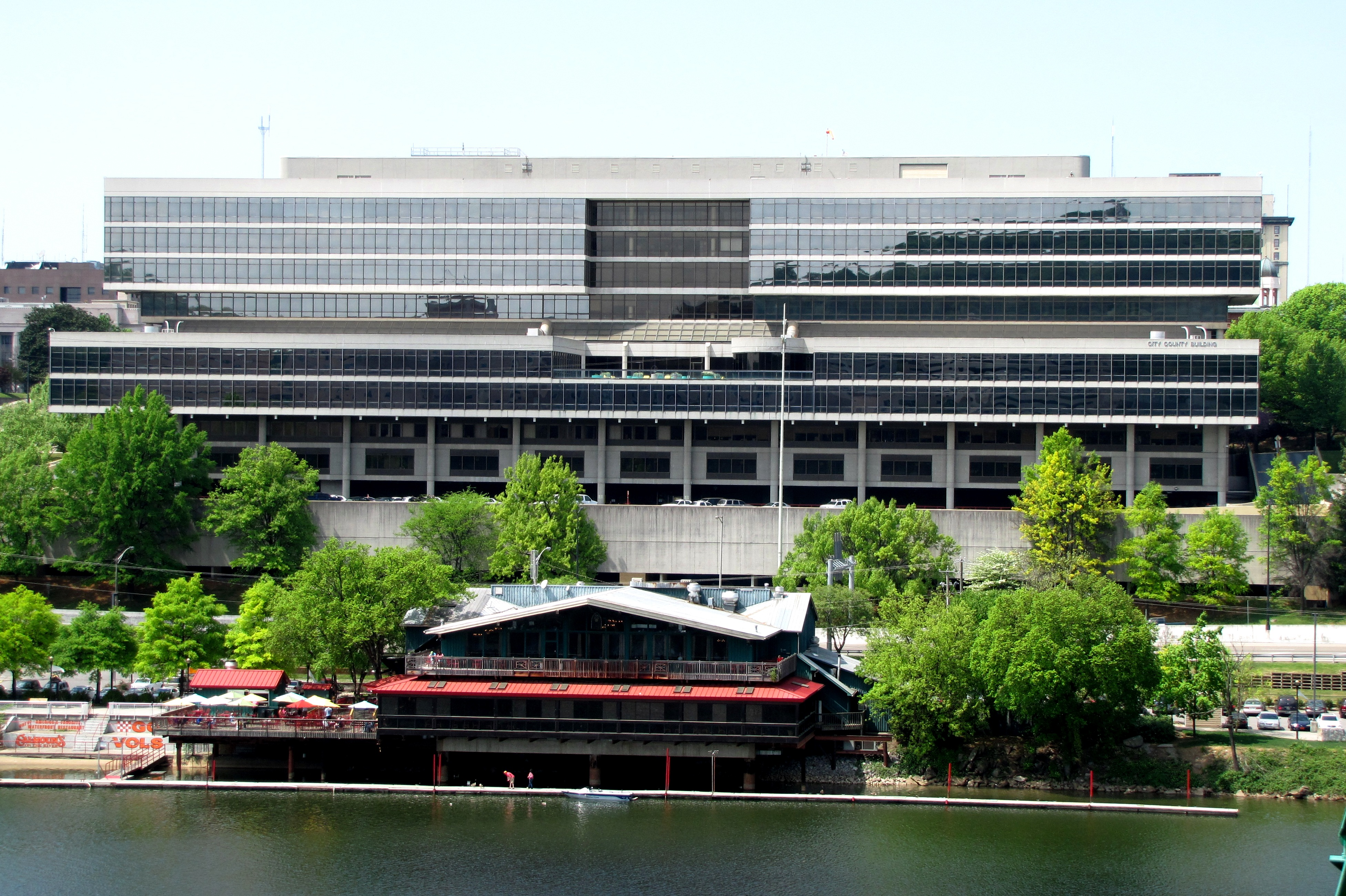
The City-County Building, viewed from the Gay Street Bridge in 2010

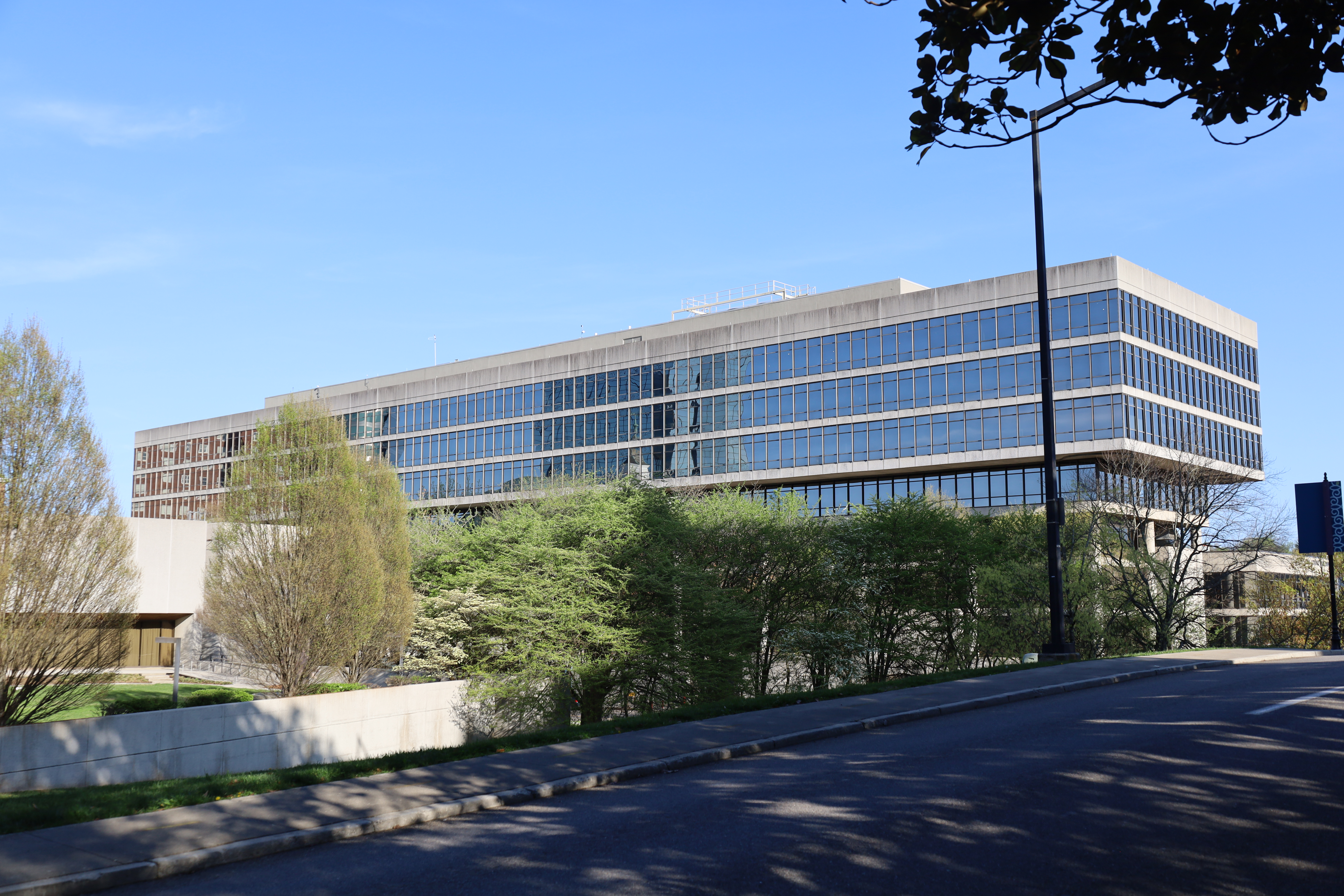
The other side of the building in 2025

The Knoxville City-County Building is a building at 400 Main Street in Knoxville, Tennessee that houses the offices of the city government of Knoxville and the county government of Knox County, Tennessee. It also houses the Knox County Jail. The building stands ten stories, and contains 534,000 square feet (49,600 m^{2}) of office space. At the time it was built it was said to be the largest office building in Tennessee.

The building was completed in 1980, 50 years after a combined city-county government building was first proposed. Businessman Jim Haslam is considered responsible for the success of the initiative to build it. The cost of the building was $26 million, much of it funded by municipal bond issues (the bonds were paid off in 2001). The building was designed by Knoxville architect Bruce McCarty and his firm, McCarty Bullock Holsaple.

Almost immediately after opening, the jail struggled with overcrowding issues. In 1986, a class action lawsuit was filed in federal court, claiming the jail was too crowded, and three years later, a judge ruled the facility unconstitutional. When the county failed to resolve the issue, the judge ruled the county in contempt of court, forcing the county to build a new facility, which opened in October 1994.

The building was plagued with security concerns due to bomb threats during the mid-1990s. Two mail bombs were delivered to Knox County District Attorney Randy Nichols in March 1994 and May 1994, respectively, forcing the building's evacuation. The building was again evacuated in November 1995, following a bomb threat.

== See also ==
- List of mayors of Knoxville, Tennessee
- Knox County Courthouse (Tennessee)
- Old City Hall (Knoxville)
