= Margaret Ramsey =

Tennessean businesswoman (1777–1854)

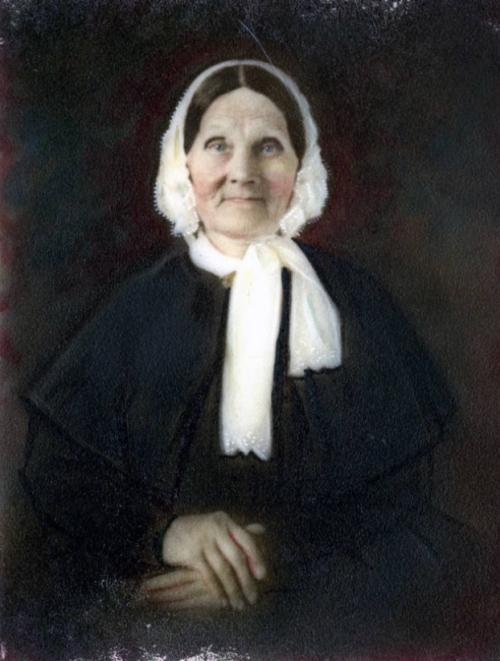
- Born: Margaret Christian Russell; June 15, 1777; North Carolina Territory, now Jefferson County, Tennessee, U.S.
- Died: April 10, 1854 (aged 76); Knoxville, Knox County, Tennessee, U.S.
- Burial place: First Presbyterian Church Cemetery
- Known for: Businesswoman and founding member of the Knoxville Library Company.
- Spouses: James Benjamin Walker Cowan (m. 1797; died 1801); Thomas Humes (m. 1802; died 1816); Francis Alexander Ramsey (m. 1820; died 1820)
- Children: Jean Glasgow Cowan (b. 1796; d. 1816); Margaret Christian Cowan (b. 1799; d. 1882); James Hervey Cowan (b. 1801; d. 1871); John Newton Humes (b. 1803; d. 1871); Mary Humes (b. 1805; d. 1882); Leah Humes (b. 1807; d. 1807); Elizabeth Humes (b. 1809; d. 1850); Thomas Scott Humes (b. 1810; d. 1812); Sarah Eleanor Humes (b. 1812; d. 1814); Thomas William Humes b. 1815; d. 1892); Andrew Russell Humes (b. 1817; d. 1847); Francis Alexander Ramsey Jr. (b. 1821; d. 1884)
- Parent(s): Andrew Russell Jr., Margaret Elizabeth Christian

Margaret Ramsey (June 15, 1777 – April 10, 1854) was a businesswoman and a civic leader in the Knoxville, Tennessee community.

Margaret balanced her personal life, which included marriage, motherhood, and widowhood, alongside her role as a local business and community leader. She was the proprietor and manager of a notable building that would become the Knoxville Hotel. She was also the only woman to become a charter member of Knoxville’s first subscription library. Her life exemplifies women’s roles in economic and institutional spaces in early American society.

Margaret's life highlights larger notions in early American history, including property ownership, civic engagement, institutional leadership, and business economics. She navigated this within the confines of early 19th-century gender constraints and social norms.

== Personal life ==
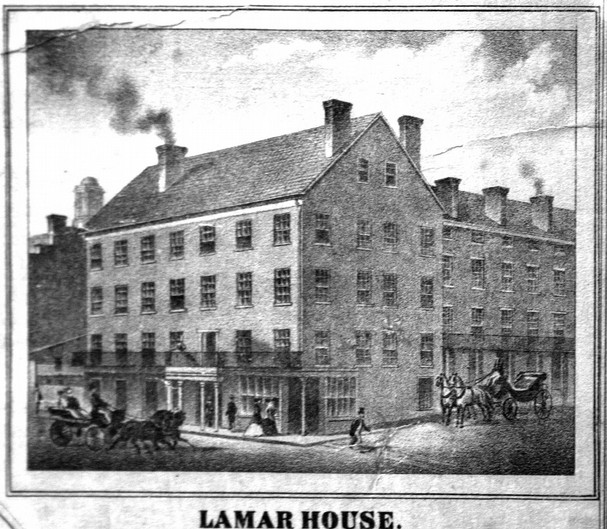
Early Lamar House sketch

She was born on June 15th, 1777 in what was North Carolina territory, the area is now Jefferson County, Tennessee. Her parents came from Virginia, and fought for independence from the British during the American Revolution. By the age of 13, both of her parents had passed away.

On May 5, 1795, she married James Benjamin Walker Cowan, a Scottish immigrant, in Jefferson County, Tennessee. The couple had three children before relocating to Knoxville in 1801, where James joined his brothers in a merchant business. That same year, her husband died, leaving Margaret widowed and pregnant at age 24.

She married her second husband, Thomas Humes, an Irish immigrant, on April 27, 1802, in Knoxville. Together, they had eight children, three of whom died in infancy or early childhood. The couple began building a large residence on Gay Street, but Thomas Humes died in 1816 before its completion. On April 13, 1820, she married Francis Alexander Ramsey, a businessman from Pennsylvania and a prominent Knoxville figure. Ramsey died only seven months later, leaving her widowed for the third time and pregnant once again.

In total, she married three times and had twelve children.

== Business and civic contributions ==
=== Humes Building and the Knoxville Hotel ===
After the death of her second husband, Margaret inherited the large and unfinished Humes Residence on Gay Street. While it was originally intended as a dwelling for the family, she recognized its business potential. She completed the construction and began leasing the property for commercial use in 1817.

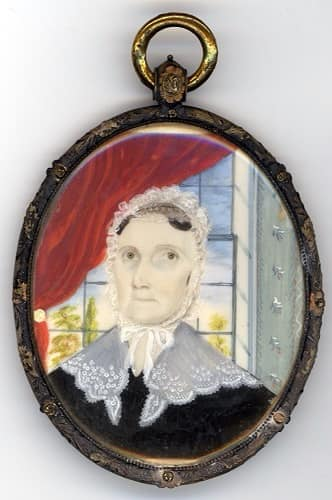
Painted Portrait of Margaret Christian Russell Cowan Humes Ramsey, c. 1850

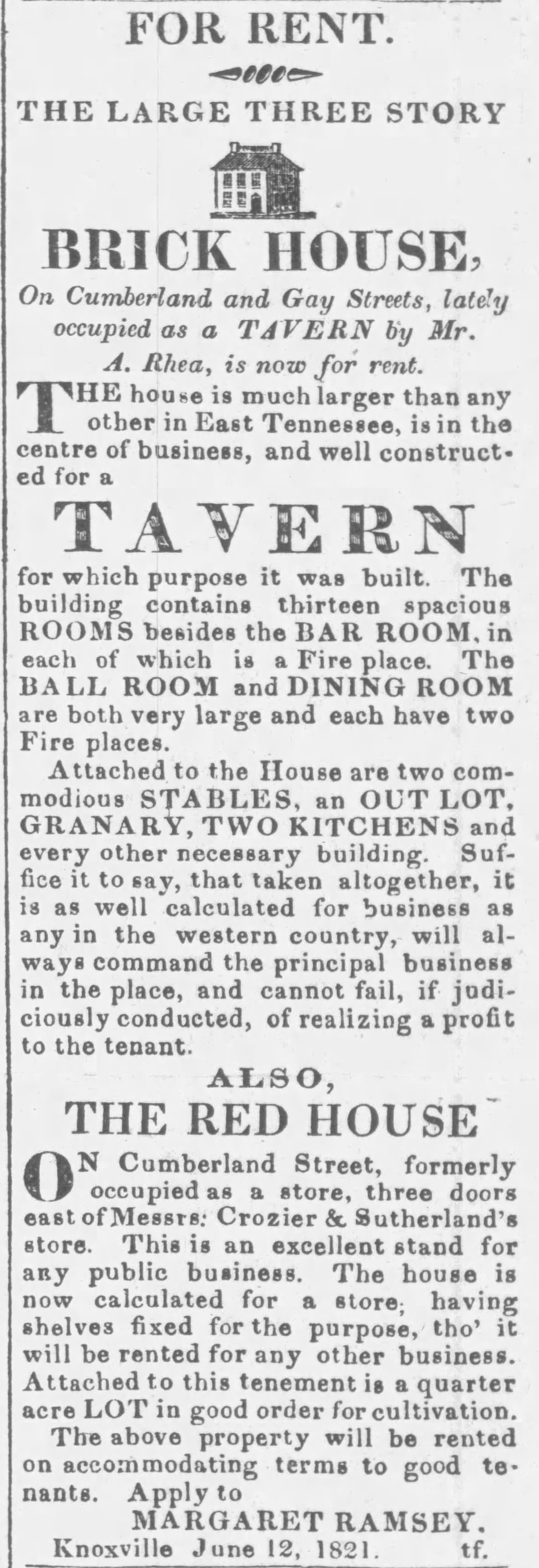
Leasing The Humes Home, Knoxville, TN, 1821.

In July 1817, she leased the property under the management of Archibald Rhea, who opened it as the Knoxville Hotel. It soon developed a reputation as one of the most prestigious establishments in the city. The hotel featured 13 guest rooms, a ballroom, dining facilities, and a bar, each with its own fireplace, and hosted parties, concerts, and receptions, including one honoring General Andrew Jackson. Over time, the property became known as the Lamar House, and later, the site of the Bijou Theatre, one of Knoxville’s most historic landmarks. While the scope of Margaret's daily role within the property is unclear, historical accounts identify her as the proprietor and the owner of one of Knoxville’s earliest and most well-known commercial buildings.

=== Knoxville Library Company ===
In 1817, a group of forty-eight Knoxville residents established the Knoxville Library Company, the city’s first organized library, and the earliest formal library initiative in East Tennessee. Among the forty-eight charter members, Margaret was the only woman. The subscription-based library, incorporated by the Tennessee legislature, was open to members on Saturday afternoons and offered books on subjects such as botany, rhetoric, biography, and exploration. Though records are limited, the library flourished for at least seven years.

== Historical context ==
Margaret Ramsey's life highlights multiple themes in historical women's scholarship, emphasizing women’s economic activity in early American society, proprietorship, civic contributions, and entrepreneurship. Her life demonstrates the overlap between domestic and business spheres and showcases how women actively participated in both.

Women in early America faced legal and social limitations, including restricted property rights, the inability to sign contracts, and expectations of domesticity. Yet, historians note that women in early nineteenth-century America actively participated in institutional and business spheres, not just domestic or small-scale trade roles. Scholars connect women’s agency in business and consumption to the development of modern economic and sociocultural systems.

Margaret's ownership of a lodging business and her involvement in property management and institutional development exemplify the business leadership available to some women and illustrate broader patterns in women’s economic roles during this era. She highlights women’s involvement in Knoxville’s hospitality economy and the combining of women’s business roles with broader U.S. commerce and society.

As the only woman among forty-eight founding members of the Knoxville Library Company in 1817, Margaret's participation exemplifies women’s growing presence in educational and institutional spheres. Such involvement allowed for advances in literacy, philanthropy, and women’s reform movements.

== Death and legacy ==
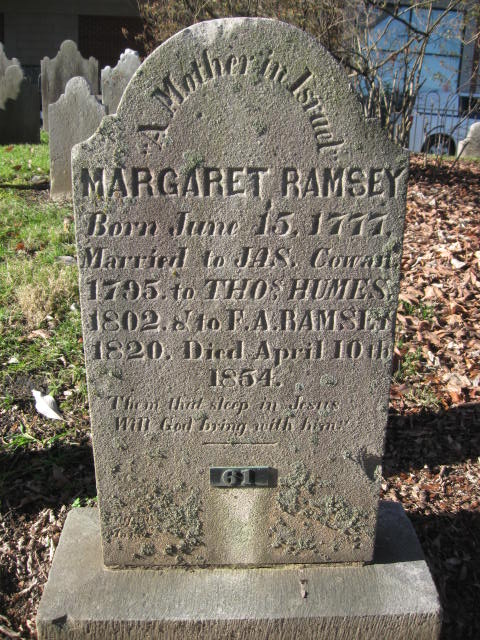
Grave of Margaret Ramsey

Margaret Cowan Humes Ramsey died on April 10, 1854, in Knoxville, Tennessee. She was among the last to be interred in the historic cemetery of the First Presbyterian Church. Her contributions to Knoxville’s commercial and civic development are recognized as an early example of women’s participation in business and institutional life in the southern United States.

Her son Thomas William Humes developed a passion for education, likely passed down from his mother's role within her community. In the late 1860's he was granted a Peabody fund, which he used towards the development of a public school system in the city. In 1865, he was hired as the president of the then East Tennessee University, now the University of Tennessee. He was also the first hired librarian for the Lawson McGhee Library in 1886. In 1888, he published a book, Loyal Mountaineers of Tennessee, which was an account of the Civil War in East Tennessee.
