= Mary Boyce (disambiguation) =

Mary Boyce (1920–2006) was a British scholar of Iranian languages, and an authority on Zoroastrianism.

Mary Boyce may also refer to:

- Mary Boyce Temple (1856–1929), American philanthropist and socialite
- Mary Cunningham Boyce, American professor of engineering
