= Oliver Perry Temple =

American attorney (1820–1907)

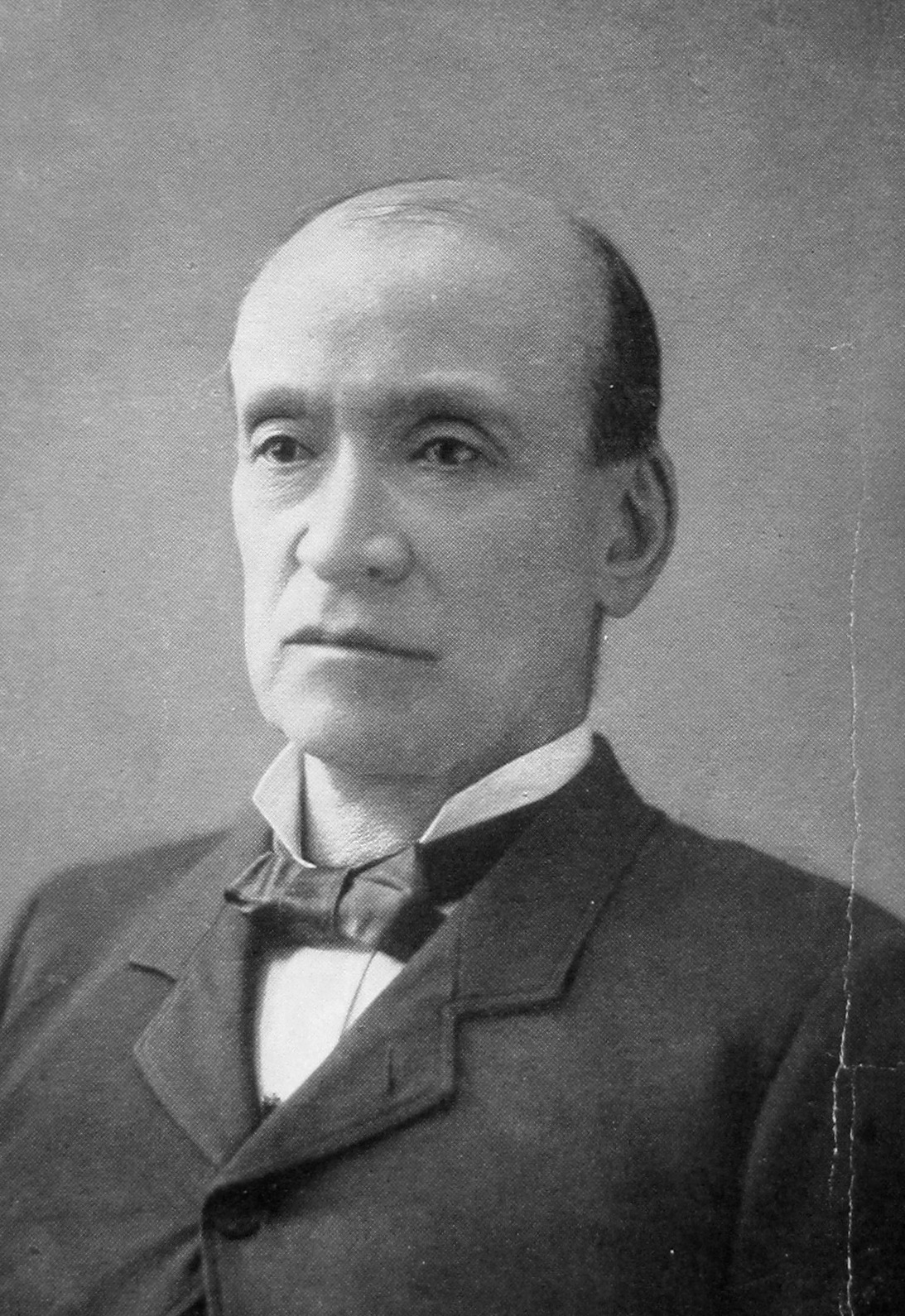
- Born: Oliver Perry Temple; January 27, 1820; Greene County, Tennessee, U.S.
- Died: November 2, 1907 (aged 87); Knoxville, Tennessee, U.S.
- Resting place: Old Gray Cemetery; Knoxville, Tennessee, U.S.
- Education: Washington College
- Occupation: Attorney
- Notable work: The Covenanter, the Cavalier, and the Puritan (1897); East Tennessee and the Civil War (1899); Notable Men of Tennessee (1912)
- Political party: Whig; Constitutional Union; Republican
- Spouse: Scotia Caledonia Hume
- Children: Mary Boyce Temple
- Parent(s): James and Mary Craig Temple

Oliver Perry Temple (January 27, 1820 – November 2, 1907) was an American attorney, author, judge, and economic promoter active primarily in East Tennessee in the latter half of the 19th century. During the months leading up to the Civil War, Temple played a pivotal role in organizing East Tennessee's Unionists. In June 1861, he drafted the final resolutions of the pro-Union East Tennessee Convention, and spent much of the first half of the war providing legal defense for Unionists who had been charged with treason by Confederate authorities.

After the war, Temple promoted agricultural and industrial development in East Tennessee, most notably by assisting in the development of the Rugby Colony, and in later years wrote several books on the history of East Tennessee.

== Early life ==
Temple was born near Greeneville, Tennessee, to James and Mary (Craig) Temple, and was raised on his father's large farm. As a teenager, he was fond of debating, and would walk miles to participate in debate societies at country schools. At age 16, he enrolled in the fledgling Greeneville College, but quit in 1838 to march with the state militia to suppress a Cherokee uprising.

While serving with the militia, Temple was inspired to study law after reading An Essay Concerning Human Understanding by English philosopher John Locke. He attended Tusculum College from 1838 to 1841, and attended Washington College from 1841 to 1844. At the latter, he was a classmate and mentor of future North Carolina governor Zebulon Vance. After graduating from Washington College, Temple studied law under Judge Robert McKinney, and was admitted to the bar in 1846. He initially practiced in Greeneville in partnership with future Arkansas Supreme Court justice, Freeman Compton.

In 1847, Temple challenged Democratic incumbent Andrew Johnson for the 1st district congressional seat. He criticized Johnson for voting to censure General Zachary Taylor, opposing a payraise for soldiers, and pandering to Whig voters by attacking President James K. Polk. Two days before the election, the two engaged in a fierce debate in Jonesborough in which they accused one another of selfishly avoiding service in the Mexican–American War. Temple later wrote that Johnson, displaying a "haughty air of superiority," dismissed him as a "Juvenile Competitor" and threatened to disgrace him if he didn't withdraw from the race. On election day, Johnson narrowly prevailed, 5,758 votes to 5,342.

In 1848, Temple moved to Knoxville, Tennessee, where he established a law partnership with William H. Sneed.

In 1850, Temple was appointed by President Millard Fillmore commissioner to help conciliate Indian tribes in territories captured during the Mexican–American War to the United States government. Upon returning to Knoxville, he helped establish the Knoxville and Ohio Railroad, and briefly served as a director of the East Tennessee and Georgia Railroad. In 1855, after Sneed was elected to Congress, Temple established a law partnership with future federal judge Connally Trigg.

At Knoxville's Southern Commercial Convention in 1856, Temple opposed a resolution calling for the reopening of the African slave trade. In 1860, he attended the Constitutional Union Party convention in Baltimore. He served as an elector for the party's candidate, John Bell, during that year's presidential election.

== Civil War ==
As secession fervor swept into Knoxville in the wake of the election of Abraham Lincoln in November 1860, Temple organized a meeting for the city's Unionists at his house to plot a course of action. They agreed to counter the secessionists at a November 26 citywide assembly at the Knox County Courthouse that had been called to discuss a possible statewide secession convention. This assembly and a subsequent assembly on December 8, at which Temple delivered two speeches, were both particularly contentious, and provided a rallying point for the region's Unionists. Inspired by these efforts, counties across East Tennessee held similar meetings and declared their loyalty to the Union.

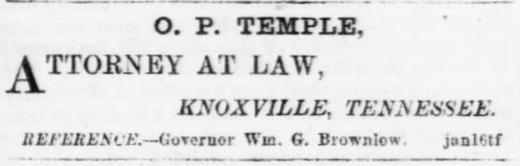
1866 advertisement for Temple in the Knoxville Whig

Temple and other Unionists canvassed East Tennessee throughout the first half of 1861. At a speech in front of a hostile crowd near what is now Concord, Temple argued that while the Constitution protected slavery, he would prefer slavery "perish" if it meant preserving the Union. Temple's Gay Street office provided a popular meeting place for the city's Unionists during this period. Temple later recalled defusing a confrontation at his office between former Constitutional Union Party candidate John Bell, who had recently switched sides and supported secession, and radical Unionist newspaper editor William G. Brownlow, in May 1861.

During the June, 1861 East Tennessee Convention in Greeneville, Temple drafted a set of resolutions that would eventually be approved by the convention delegates and later presented to the Tennessee General Assembly. Temple's resolutions, which he drew up as an alternative to an earlier set of convention resolutions that were deemed too provocative, essentially asked the legislature to allow the counties of East Tennessee to withdraw from Tennessee and form a separate, Union-aligned state. The state legislature rejected the convention proposal, and at the urging of influential pro-Confederacy supporters Confederate in East Tennessee, Confederate military forces were transported by rail into southern East Tennessee and these rebel troops occupied Knoxville shortly thereafter.

Temple fled to the North in August 1861 after Brownlow warned that Confederate authorities were planning to arrest Knoxville's Unionists. Within a few weeks, he returned, however, after promising the city's Confederate leaders he would remain neutral during the conflict. He spent much of the first half of the war providing legal defense for Unionists accused of various offenses, including members of East Tennessee bridge-burning conspiracy and several participants in the Great Locomotive Chase.

When the Union Army entered Knoxville in September 1863, Temple joyously ran the length of Gay Street behind a regiment of soldiers. Shortly after the army's arrival, General Ulysses S. Grant met with Temple at Melrose, and inquired about the feasibility of marching up the French Broad River into North Carolina, and then north to Virginia in an attempt to outflank Robert E. Lee. Temple advised against this, warning that the terrain of the Blue Ridge Mountains made such a trek nearly impossible.

== Later life ==
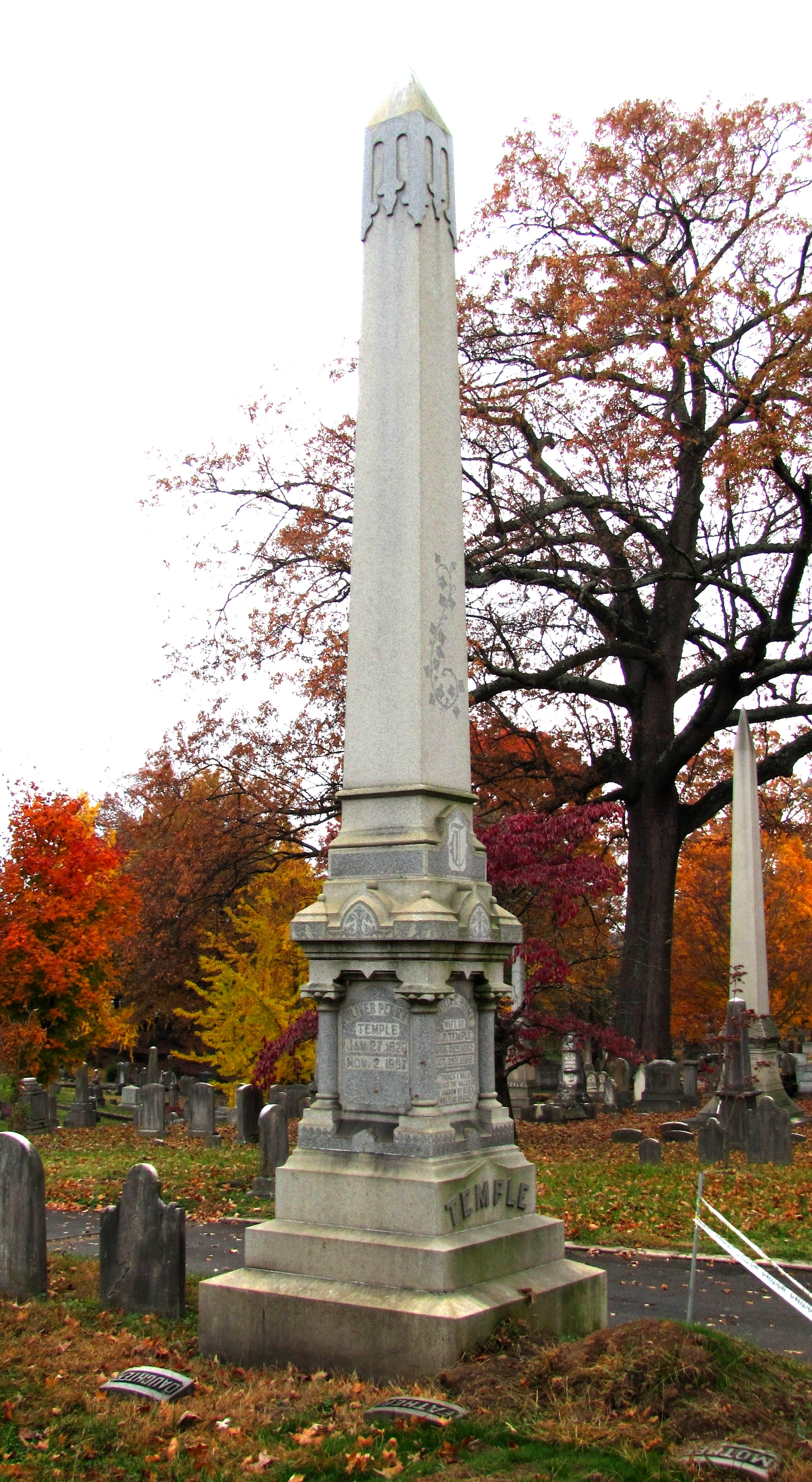
Temple family obelisk at Old Gray Cemetery

After the war, Temple quickly formed a new law firm with Samuel A. Rogers and James Deaderick. In 1866, he was appointed chancellor of Tennessee's Eighth Chancery District, succeeding Samuel R. Rodgers, who had died. In 1870, he was moved to the Second Chancery District, where he served as chancellor until 1878. Temple's annual income of more than $13,000 was the highest reported in the 1870 census in Knox County, edging out the partners of the wholesaling giant, Cowan, McClung and Company. He lost much of his fortune during the Panic of 1873, however.

Throughout the 1870s, Temple, as the "spirit" behind the Knoxville Industrial Association and as the president of the East Tennessee Farmers' Convention, championed economic development in East Tennessee. As he stated in a speech before the Association in 1869, Temple believed in a diversified economy that was based on both agriculture and industry. He gave numerous lectures extolling East Tennessee's climate and natural resources during this period.

In the late 1870s and early 1880s, Temple provided legal, agricultural, and promotional assistance to the Rugby Colony, then being developed on the Cumberland Plateau. On September 16, 1880, Temple hosted a large dinner in Knoxville for the colony's founder, Thomas Hughes, and spoke at the "opening" of the colony several days later.

Temple retired from the legal profession in 1880, and with the help of Congressman Leonidas C. Houk, was appointed Knox County's postmaster the following year. In 1893, he wrote a sketch of Tennessee governor John Sevier to mark the occasion of the reinterment of Sevier on the lawn of the Knox County Courthouse. In 1897, he published The Covenanter, The Cavalier, and The Puritan, which discusses the origins and contributions of the Scotch-Irish (Temple uses the broader term "Covenanter") in American history.

=== East Tennessee and the Civil War ===
In 1899, Temple published his Civil War memoir, East Tennessee and the Civil War, the purpose of which was to vindicate the actions of East Tennessee's Unionists, many of whom were considered traitors by fellow Southerners. Like his contemporary, Thomas William Humes, Temple traces the origins of East Tennessee's Unionist sentiments to Revolutionary War patriotism, but goes a step further, arguing this sentiment was rooted in the early influence of Scotch-Irish Covenanter settlers, who were devout and independent, and zealously committed to religious and political liberty.

Temple rejected secession as unconstitutional, arguing that the Founders clearly envisioned a perpetual Union. He argued that revolt was only acceptable to overthrow an unjust government, and endeavored to show that not only had the federal government gone to great pains to appease Southern slaveowners, but had been favorable to Southern interests throughout much of the nation's history. Temple suggested that the secession movement had little to do with slavery or states' rights, but was driven instead by Southern elites more concerned with personal ambitions. He went so far as to suggest that most Southerners opposed secession in 1860, and that votes in favor of secession were the result of intimidation, fraud, and temporary panic.

Temple's book contains detailed accounts of several key events of Civil War-era East Tennessee, many of which he personally witnessed. He provides one of the more extensive descriptions of the East Tennessee bridge-burnings, having gone to great pains to identify and correspond with members of the conspiracy. He also provides an invaluable account of the East Tennessee Convention, of which he had been an integral member, having provided the draft for the convention's final resolutions.

== Death and legacy ==
Temple fell seriously ill in 1904, and never fully recovered. He died on November 2, 1907, and was buried in Knoxville's Old Gray Cemetery. A large obelisk marks the Temple family plot.

Temple married Scotia Caledonia Hume in 1851. Their only child, Mary Boyce Temple (1856–1929), compiled and published Notable Men of Tennessee, a collection of biographies her father had written about various Civil War-era figures. She was also a founding member of Knoxville's Ossoli Circle, and campaigned for women's suffrage in the early 20th century. Temple was of Scottish and English descent, and his mansion, Melrose, was named for Melrose, Scotland, the home of his wife's parents.

Temple was a trustee of the University of Tennessee for over a half-century, from 1854 until his death in 1907. He helped establish the school's College of Agriculture, and was a key advisor to President Charles Dabney. Hess Hall, on the university's campus, now stands where his Melrose mansion once stood.

== Bibliography ==
=== Books ===
- The Covenanter, The Cavalier, and The Puritan (1897)
- East Tennessee and the Civil War (1899)
- John Sevier: Citizen, Soldier, Legislator, Governor, Statesman, 1744–1815 (1910)
- Notable Men of Tennessee (1912)

=== Speeches ===
- "An Address Delivered Before the Knoxville Industrial Association" (1869)

== See also ==
- James C. Luttrell
- Samuel Cole Williams
