= Old Gray Cemetery =

Historic cemetery in Tennessee, United States

- U.S. National Register of Historic Places
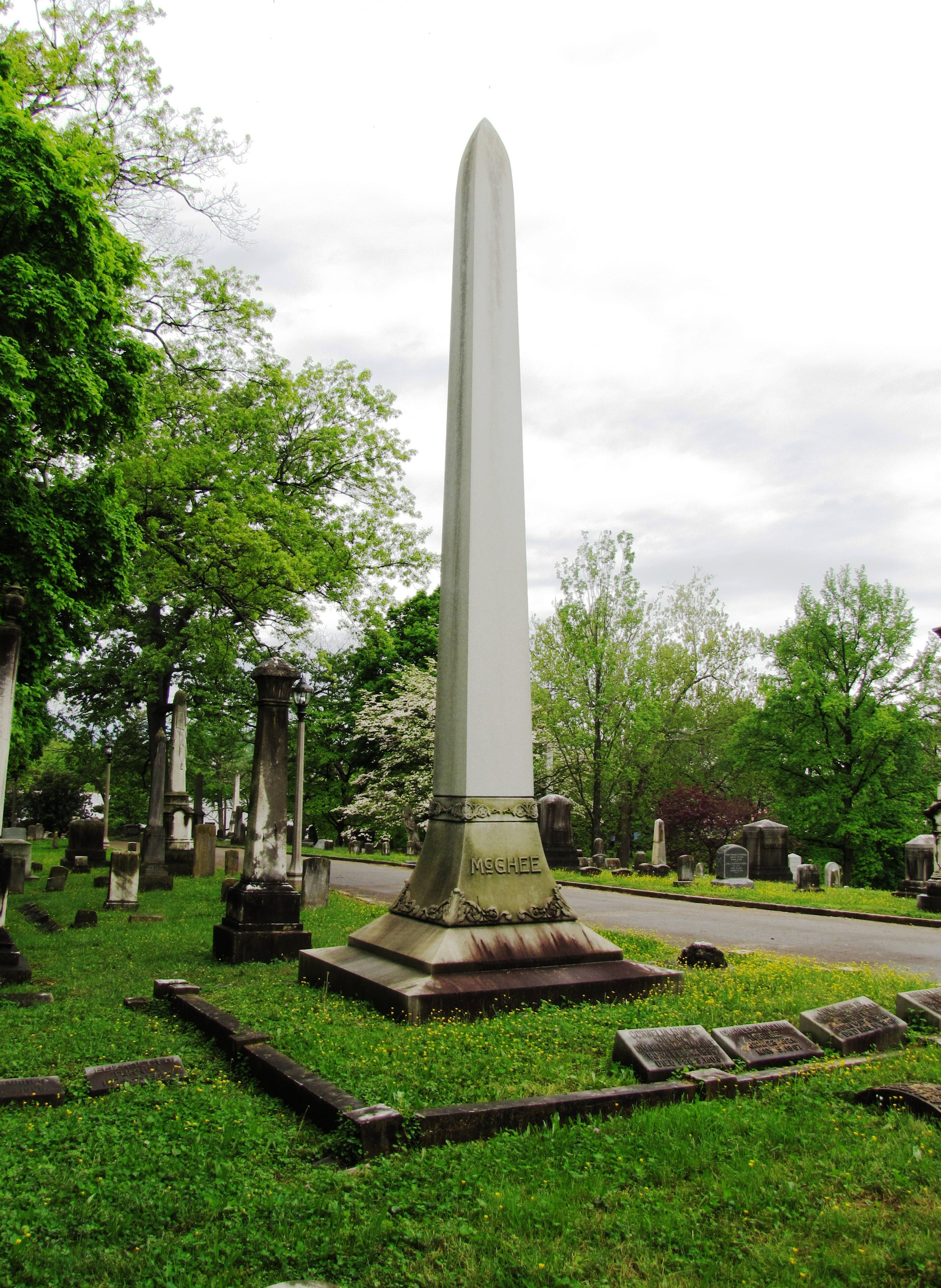
- McGhee obelisk

- Location within Tennessee Location within the United States
- Location: 543 N. Broadway; Knoxville, Tennessee
- Coordinates: 35°58′26″N 83°55′29″W
- Built: 1850
- MPS: Knoxville and Knox County MPS
- NRHP reference No.: 96001402
- Added to NRHP: December 4, 1996

Old Gray Cemetery is the second-oldest cemetery in Knoxville, Tennessee. Established in 1850, the 13.47-acre (5.45 ha) cemetery contains the graves of some of Knoxville's most influential citizens, ranging from politicians and soldiers, to artists and activists. It is noted for the Victorian era marble sculpture and elaborate carvings adorning many of the grave markers and headstones. In 1996, the cemetery was added to the National Register of Historic Places.

Named for English poet Thomas Gray, Old Gray Cemetery is an example of a so-called garden cemetery, a mid-19th-century style that sought the transition of graveyards from urban churchyards to quiet suburban plots. Unlike its crowded predecessor, the First Presbyterian Church Cemetery, Old Gray features spacious graves, grand monuments, and extensive vegetation, and its layout bears more resemblance to a public park. Playwright Tennessee Williams mentions Old Gray in his short story, "The Man in the Overstuffed Chair," and Pulitzer Prize-winning novelist Peter Taylor alludes to the cemetery in his book, In the Tennessee Country. The cemetery was simply known as "Gray Cemetery" until 1892, when "New" Gray Cemetery was established about a mile away.

== History ==
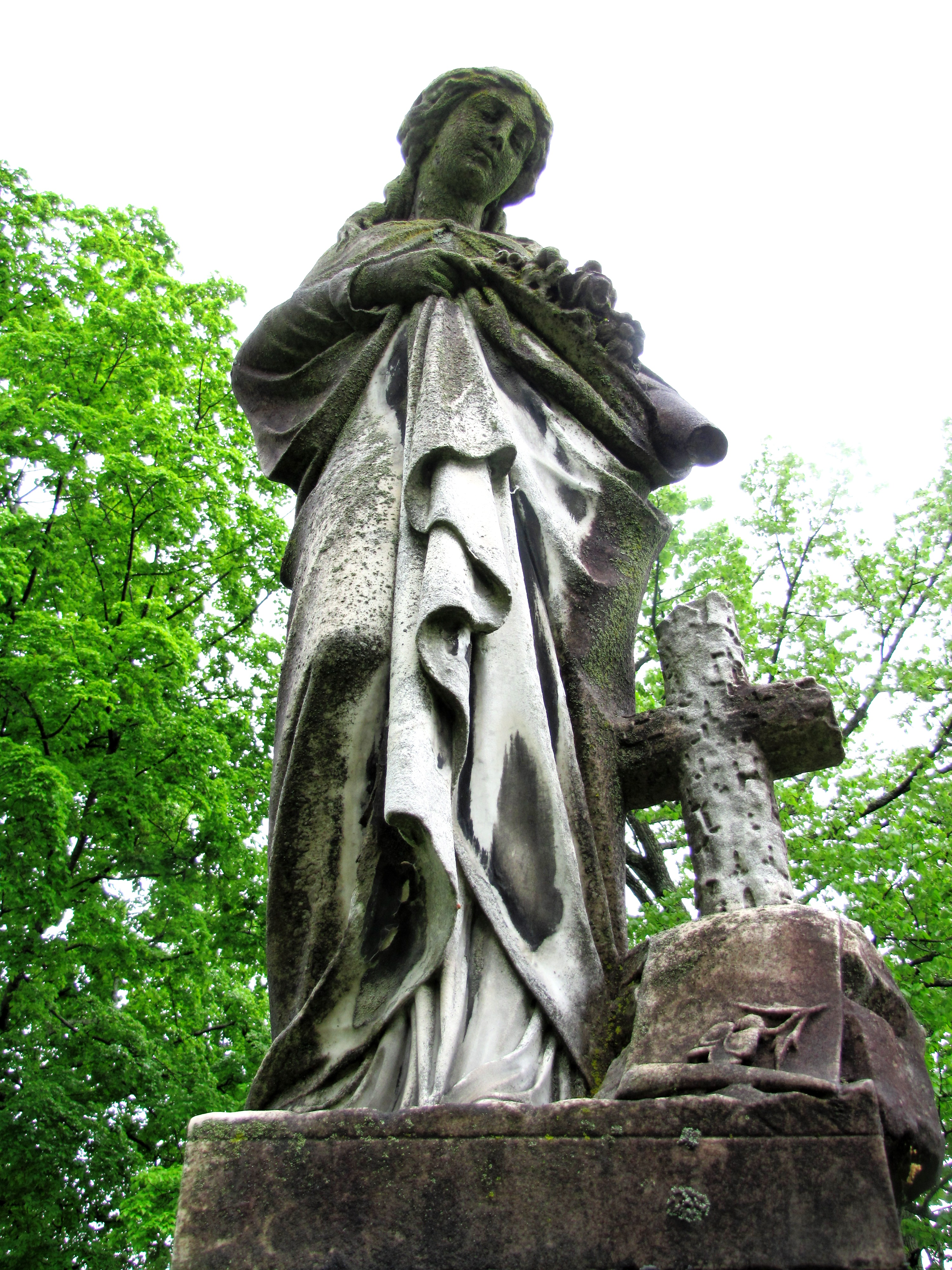
Marble sculpture atop Ora Brewster monument

By the 1840s the garden cemetery movement, driven largely by the fame of Paris's Père Lachaise Cemetery, had gained popularity in France, England, and the United States, as planners in large cities began building larger, more elaborate cemeteries in city outskirts and suburbs. During this period, Knoxville's leaders sought such a cemetery for Knoxville, as many had incorrectly believed the First Presbyterian Church Cemetery (near the center of town) had caused a deadly epidemic in 1838. In February 1850, a board of trustees, led by East Tennessee University President William B. Reese was appointed to buy land and sell lots for a cemetery.

The site of Old Gray Cemetery was previously pastureland located just outside the northwestern city limits. Only a mile from the downtown area, it was considered ideal for a suburban cemetery. Land was purchased in December 1849, and landscape architect Frederick Douglass was hired to come up with a groundplan. At the suggestion of Reese's wife, Henrietta, the cemetery was named after English poet Thomas Gray, author of Elegy Written in a Country Churchyard.

The cemetery was dedicated on June 1, 1852, with the sale of the first 40 grave lots. The first burial had, however, occurred on July 15 of the previous year, after a local man named William Martin died of wounds from a cannon explosion during the city's Fourth-of-July celebration. Martin's grave was not marked, but a small marble memorial in the northwest section of the cemetery recalls the incident.

Many early burials were victims of Knoxville's 1854 cholera epidemic. The cemetery also contains several dozen victims of the New Market train wreck of 1904. In 1912, the cemetery witnessed one of the largest funeral processions ever conducted in the South, when some 40,000 mourners attended the burial of former Tennessee Governor Robert "Fiddlin' Bob" Taylor (Taylor's grave has since been moved to Johnson City.)

== Layout ==
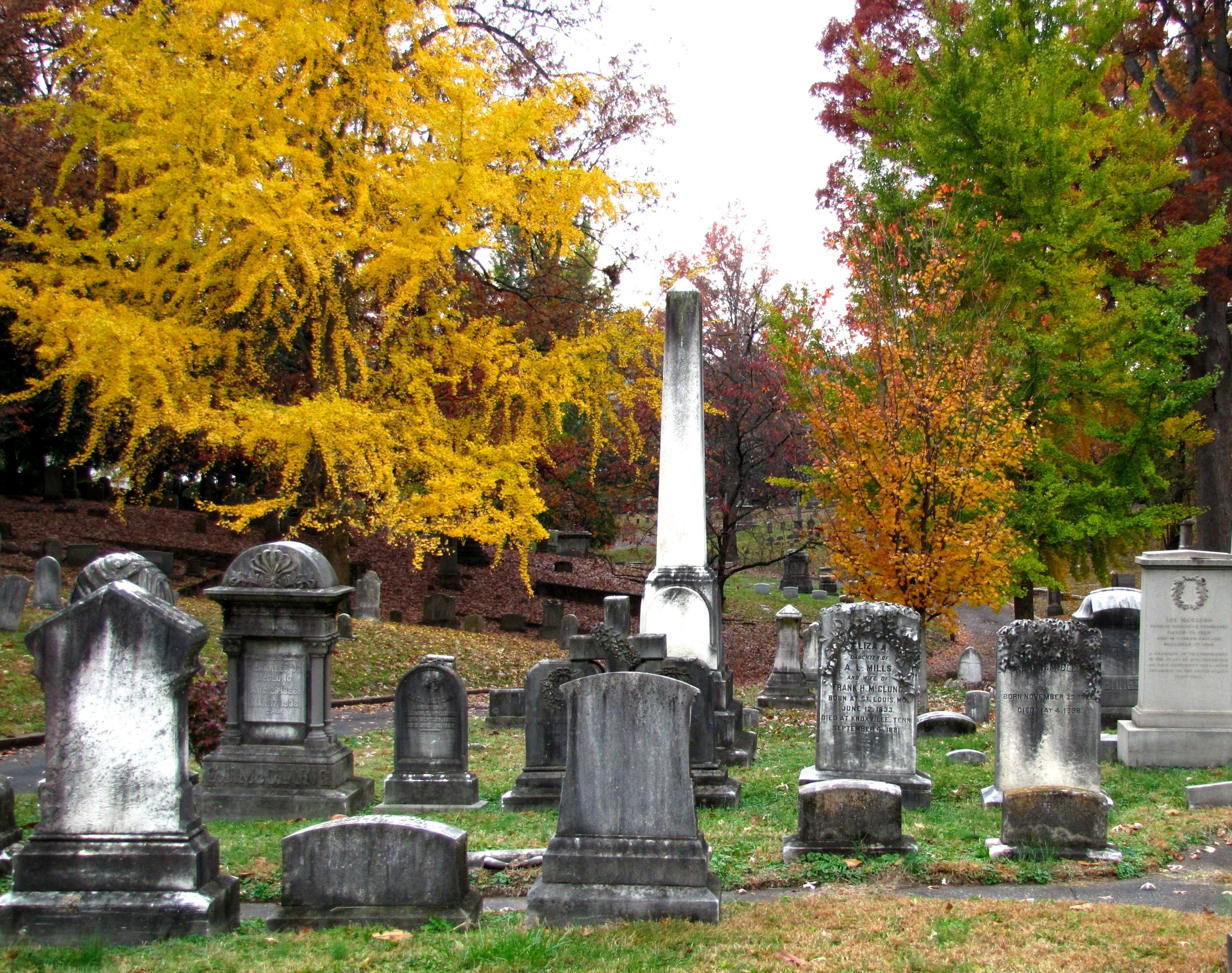
The southwest section of Old Gray in Autumn

Old Gray Cemetery is shaped like an awkward pentagon, with a "handle" opening toward its main (eastern) entrance on Broadway. Secondary entrances are located in the northern corner along Tyson Street and in the western corner along Cooper Street. A paved avenue connects all three entrances, and paved roadways twist and turn throughout the cemetery. Roads, trees, and grave plots all follow the natural topography. The National Register-listed St. John's Lutheran Church stands opposite the cemetery's main entrance.

The administrative office is located just inside the main gate. Beyond the entrance, the main avenue splits around a circle, which once contained the 20-foot (6.1 m) Albers Fountain. The perimeter is partially surrounded by a low stone wall and partially by an iron fence with double-iron gates and marble posts at the main entrance, and walk-through gates at the secondary entrances. The northwest wall is shared with the adjacent Knoxville National Cemetery.

== Monuments ==
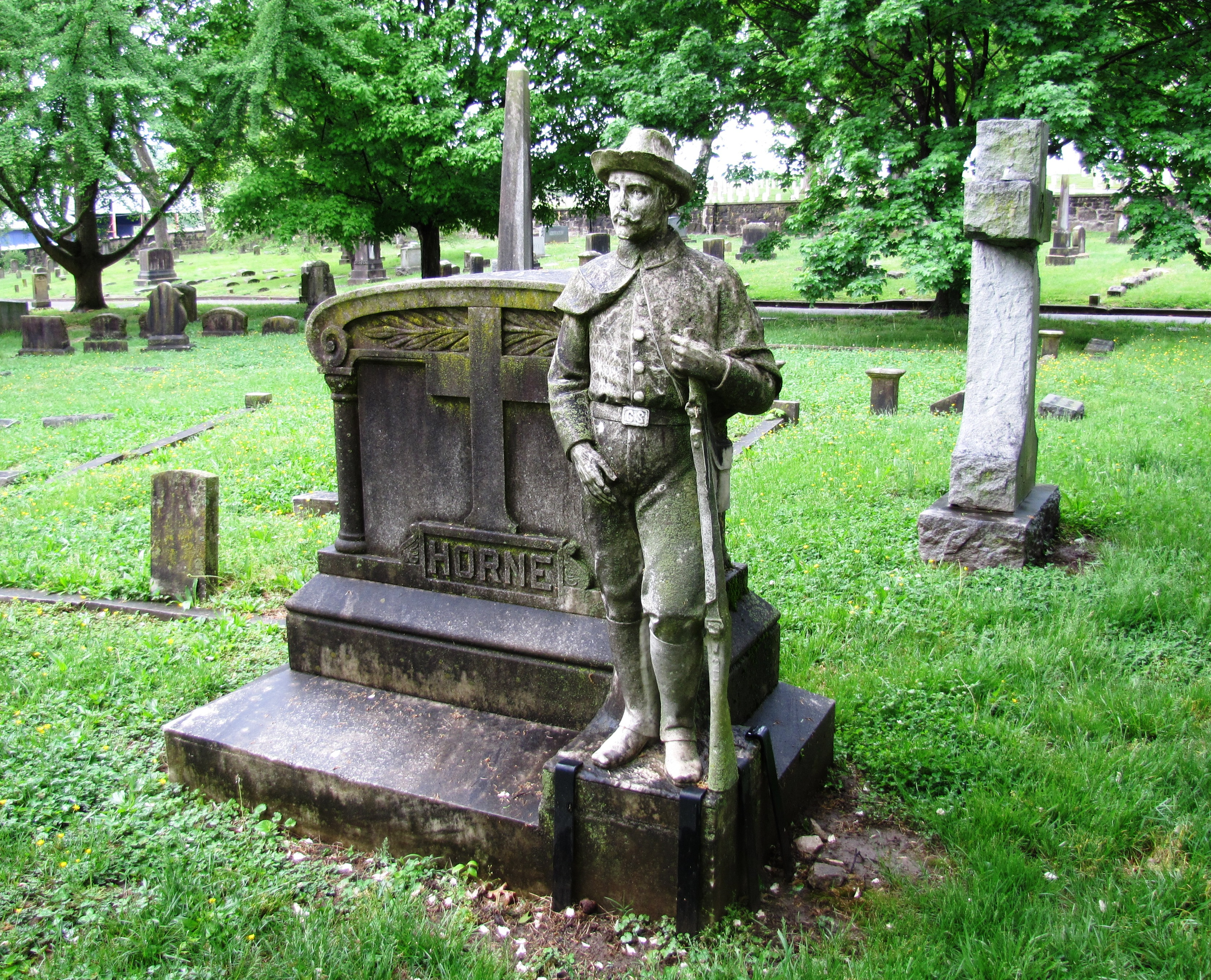
Horne monument

Unlike many modern cemeteries where the gravemarkers are carved from granite, most of the decorative monuments are carved from marble. While not as durable as granite, marble is softer and thus lends itself to more elaborate designs. Victorian angels—guardians of the dead—are the most common type of sculpture. Obelisks—which were popular grave monuments during the late 19th-century—are also found throughout the cemetery. Other notable markers include Woodmen of the World monuments—carved to depict undressed tree logs—which were given to the order's members as part of a life insurance policy. Elaborate crosses are also common, including several celtic crosses.

One of the most notable sculptures is the Horne monument, which is a near life-size statue of a Confederate soldier guarding the graves of Confederate veterans William and John Horne. A statue carved by Italian sculptor Antonio Bebelotti graces the graves of the parents of art collector Eleanor Swan Audigier, who obtained the statue while living in Rome. The obelisk of Frank S. Mead, carved by Knoxville sculptor D. H. Geddes, was used on advertisements by Mead's marble company.

== Notable interments ==
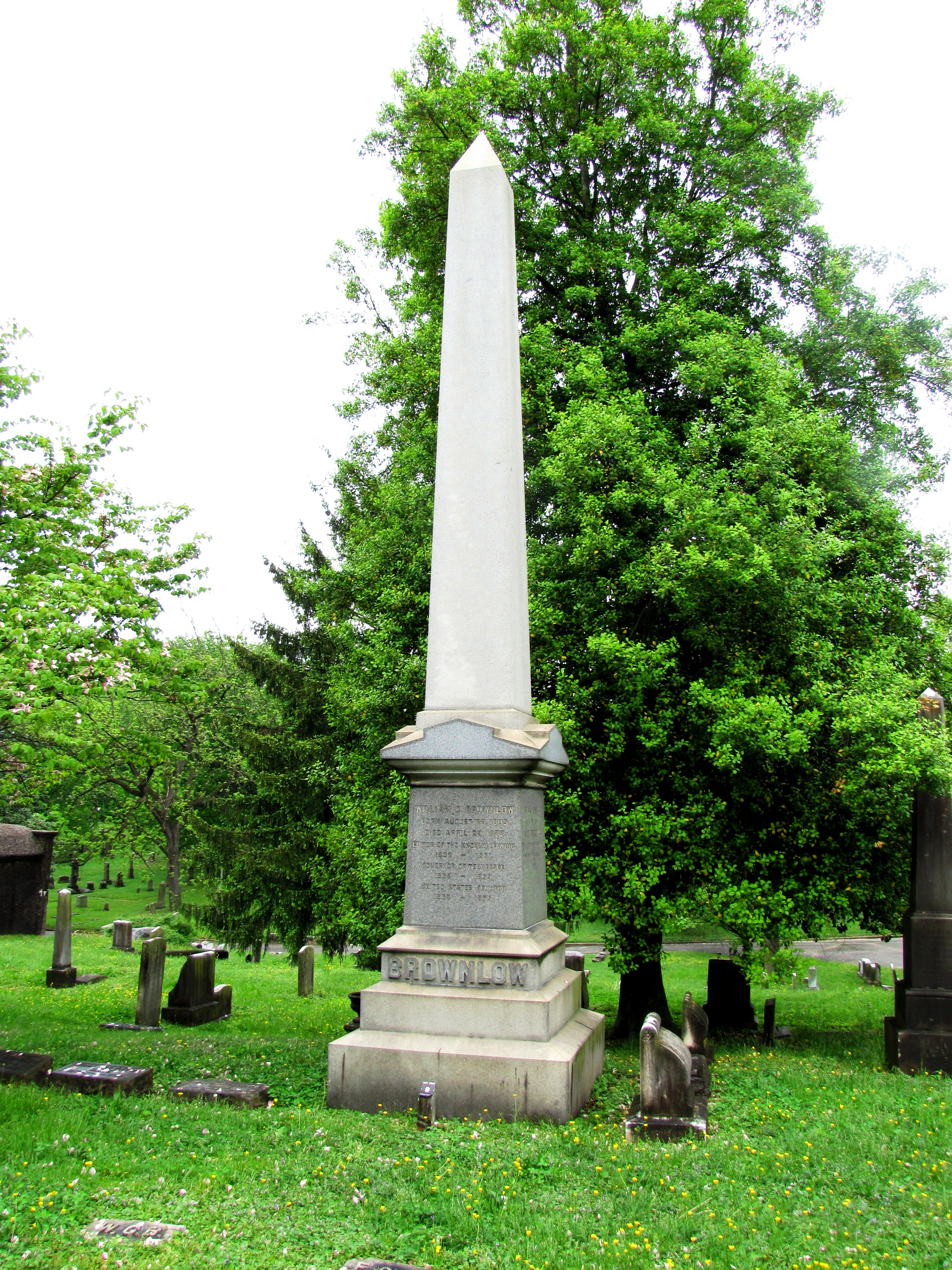
Parson Brownlow obelisk

For years, visitors have commented on the various "adversaries" buried within sight of one another. Among the most well-known of these are Knoxville businessman Joseph Alexander Mabry, Jr., his son Joseph Alexander Mabry III, and Mechanics' National Bank president Thomas O'Connor, all three of whom were killed in an 1882 shootout discussed in Mark Twain's Life on the Mississippi. The family plots of two bitter Civil War rivals, pro-Unionist William "Parson" Brownlow and pro-secessionist John Hervey Crozier, are separated only by a roadway. Two other Civil War adversaries, Union Army Major Eldad Cicero Camp and Confederate Colonel Henry Ashby, are also buried at Old Gray, the latter having been killed in a scuffle with Camp in downtown Knoxville in 1868.

Cornelius Coffin Williams (1879–1957), father of playwright Tennessee Williams, is buried in the cemetery, and his funeral is discussed in Williams's "The Man in The Overstuffed Chair." The grave of Eliza Boond Hodgson (1810–1870), mother of author Frances Hodgson Burnett, is one of the few surviving relicts of Burnett's years in the city. Author Peter Taylor mentions a 1916 funeral at a "Knoxville cemetery" for a fictitious politician in his novel, In the Tennessee Country, which may be an allusion to the lavish funeral of his grandfather, Governor Robert Love Taylor, which took place at Old Gray in 1912 (Lot 407).

- Alexander O. Anderson (1794–1869), U.S. senator
- Henry Ashby (1836–1868), Confederate colonel
- Richard W. Austin (1857–1919), U.S. congressman
- Lloyd Branson (1853–1925; Lot 916), Knoxville artist
- William G. "Parson" Brownlow (1805–1877; Lot 57), Tennessee governor and U.S. senator, editor of the Knoxville Whig
- Eldad Cicero Camp (1839–1920), Knoxville businessman, founder of the Coal Creek Coal Company
- William Caswell (1846–1926), Confederate general
- William Montgomery Churchwell (1826–1862; Lot 43), U.S. congressman, president of the failed Bank of East Tennessee in the 1850s
- John Hervey Crozier (1812–1889; Lot 35), U.S. congressman
- Perez Dickinson (1813–1901), Knoxville businessman, founder of the city's Board of Trade
- Hubert Frederick Fisher (1877–1941) U.S. congressman, football coach (University of Tennessee 1902–1903)
- John M. Fleming (1832–1900), newspaper editor and state legislator
- Margaret Elizabeth Crozier "Lizzie" French (1851–1926; Lot 302), women's suffragist leader, founder of Knoxville's Ossoli Circle
- William Henry Fizer (1861–1937), Thoroughbred racehorse trainer who won the 1907 Kentucky Derby
- William Heiskell (1788–1871; Lot 186), post-Civil War Speaker of the Tennessee House of Representatives
- Leonidas Houk (1836–1891), U.S. congressman

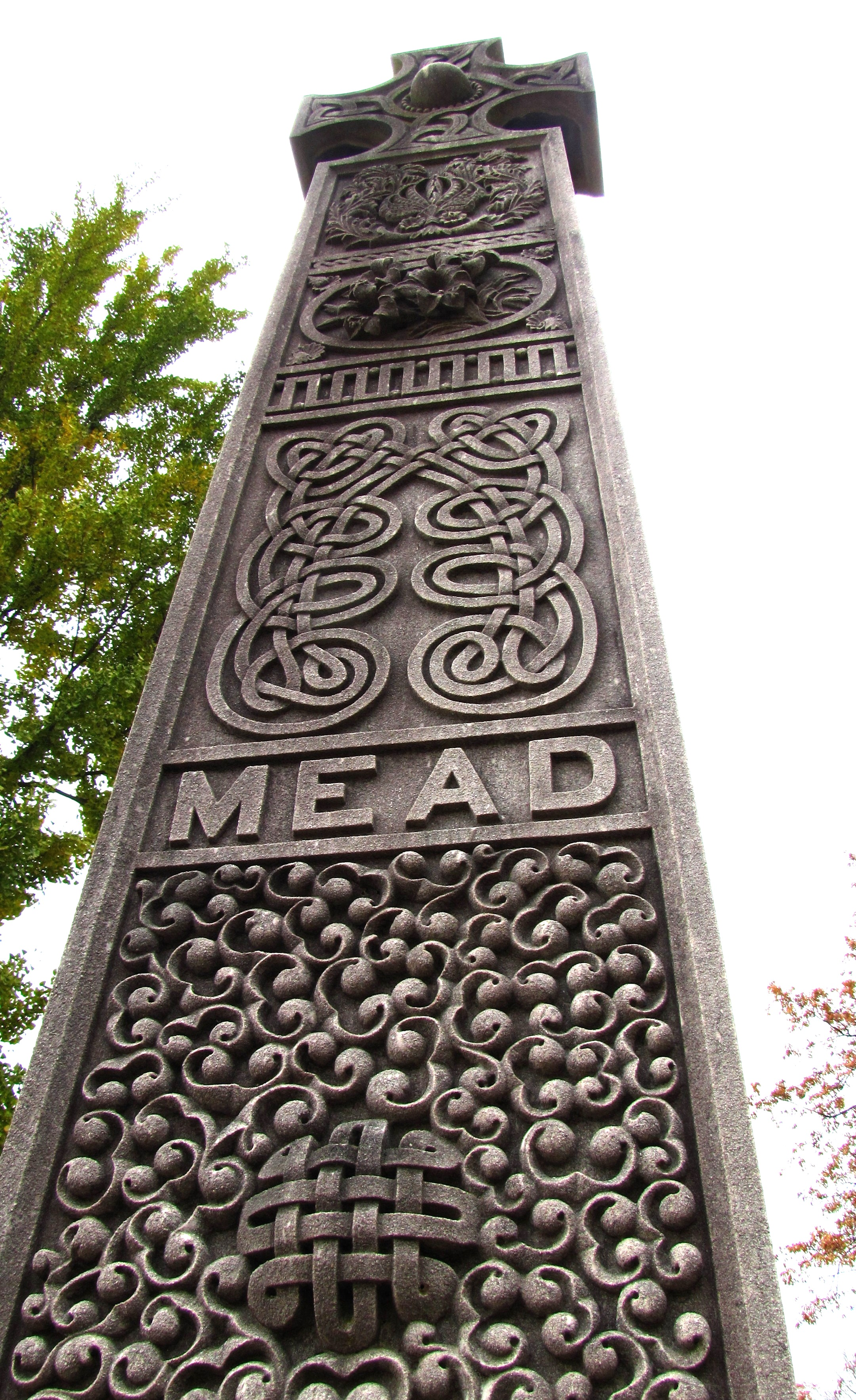
Frank S. Mead monument

- Thomas William Humes (1815–1892), president of East Tennessee University, oversaw school's transition into the University of Tennessee
- Peter Kern (1835–1907), Mayor of Knoxville and founder of Kern's Bakery
- Joseph Knaffl (1861–1938), photographer
- Joseph Alexander Mabry, Jr. (1826–1882), Knoxville businessman, builder of Mabry-Hazen House, helped establish Market Square (his name appears as "Joseph Alexander Mabry, Sr." on his monument)
- Lena B. Mathes (1861–1951), educator, social reformer, and ordained Baptist minister
- Horace Maynard (1814–1882), U.S. congressman and postmaster general
- Charles McClung (1761–1835), pioneer surveyor who laid out Knoxville in the 1790s; grave moved here by his descendants in 1904
- Lee McClung (1870–1914), Yale football standout and 22nd Treasurer of the United States
- Charles McClung McGhee (1828–1907), Knoxville railroad magnate, founder of Lawson McGhee Library
- Frank Seymour Mead (1864–1936), Knoxville businessman, founder of Republic Marble Company
- Thomas A. R. Nelson (1812–1873; Lot 882), U.S. congressman
- William Rule (1839–1928), Knoxville mayor, founder of the Knoxville Journal
- Edward J. Sanford (1831–1902), Knoxville businessman
- William Henry Sneed (1812–1869), U.S. congressman
- Peter Staub (1827–1904), Knoxville mayor and businessman, established Staub's Theater, Knoxville's first opera house
- Oliver Perry Temple (1820–1907; Lot 488), attorney, judge, and economic promoter
- Jacob Montgomery Thornburgh (1837–1890), U.S. congressman
- William Isaac Thomas (1863–1947), Professor of Sociology
- Charles McGhee Tyson (1889–1918), World War I pilot who was shot down and killed while patrolling the North Sea in 1918 and later became the namesake of McGhee Tyson Airport
- Lawrence Tyson (1861–1929), World War I general and U.S. senator.
- Catherine Wiley (1879–1958), Knoxville artist
- Joseph Lanier Williams (1810–1865), U.S. congressman.
