= Jane Franklin Hommel =

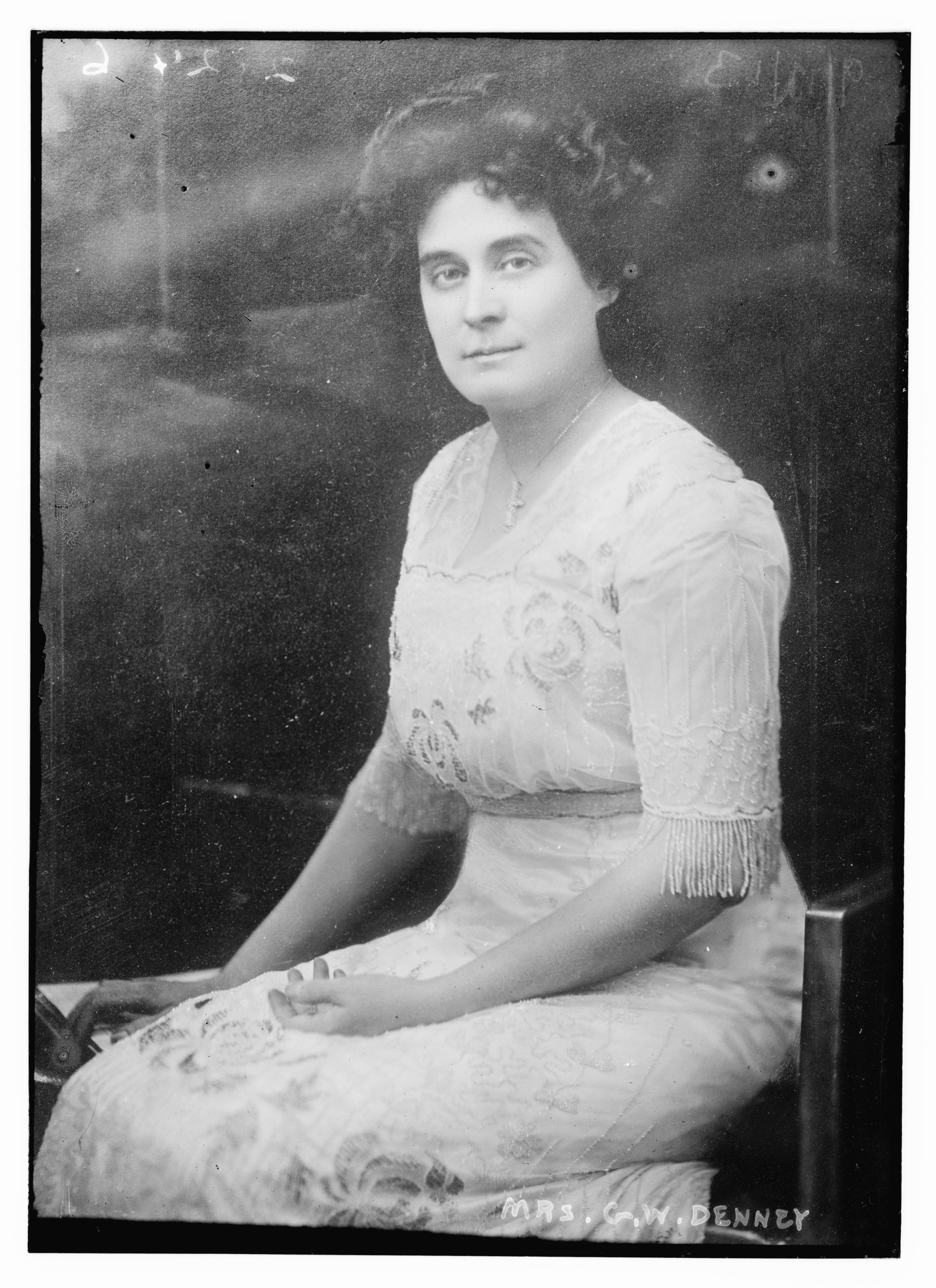

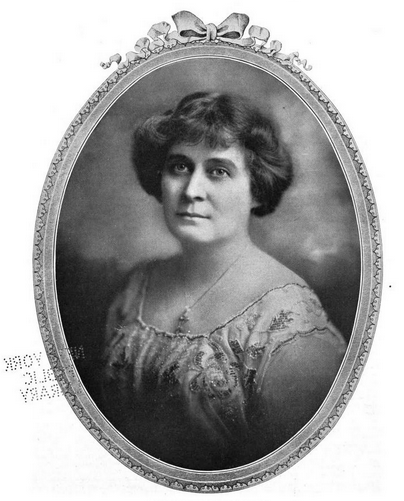
Mrs. G. W. Denney

Jane Franklin Hommel Denney (1878–1946), clubwoman, was president of the Tennessee Federation of Women's Clubs, in Knoxville, Tennessee, US.

== Biography ==
She was born May 12, 1878, as Jane Franklin Hommel, the daughter of Daniel C. Hommel and Sarah Havely of Knoxville, Tennessee. She attended East Tennessee Institute for her education. She married George W. Denney on October 3, 1899; they had one son, Joseph F. Denney. Mrs. Denney was a member of the Suffrage Club of Knoxville, and served as chair of the Women's Congress of the Appalachian Exposition in 1911. She was President of the Ossoli Circle of Knoxville in 1912–13, and treasurer of the local chapter of the Daughters of the American Revolution. She served as president of Knoxville's chapter of the United Daughters of the Confederacy, and one term as state secretary of the UDC.

She died in 1946.
