= Mary Boyce Temple =

Knoxville hostess (1856–1929)

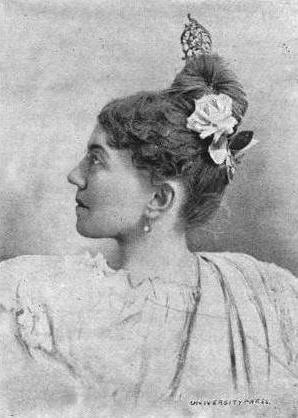
- Born: July 6, 1856; Knoxville, Tennessee, United States
- Died: May 16, 1929 (aged 72); Knoxville, Tennessee
- Resting place: Old Gray Cemetery; Knoxville, Tennessee
- Education: East Tennessee Female Institute; Vassar College
- Notable work: Sketch of Margaret Fuller Ossoli (1886), Notable Men of Tennessee (editor) (1912)
- Parent(s): Oliver Perry Temple and Scotia Caledonia Hume

Mary Boyce Temple (July 6, 1856 – May 16, 1929) was an American philanthropist and socialite, active primarily in Knoxville, Tennessee, in the late 19th and early 20th centuries. She was the first president of the Ossoli Circle, the oldest federated women's club in the South, and published a biography of the club's namesake, Margaret Fuller Ossoli, in 1886. She also cofounded the Tennessee Woman's Press and Author's Club, the Knoxville Writer's Club, and the Knox County chapter of the League of Women Voters. She represented Tennessee at various international events, including the Paris Exposition of 1900 and at the dedication of the Panama Canal in 1903.

Temple was the founder and long-time regent of the Bonny Kate Chapter of the Daughters of the American Revolution, and helped launch Knoxville's preservationist movement with her efforts to save Blount Mansion in the 1920s. In her later years, she donated tens of thousands of dollars to the University of Tennessee for agricultural research, and left the bulk of her estate to the university after her death.

== Biography ==
Temple was born in Knoxville in 1856, the only child of Oliver Perry Temple (1820–1907) and Scotia Caledonia Hume. Her father was a powerful Knoxville attorney who, at one point after the American Civil War, had the highest personal income in Knox County. During Temple's early years, her parents' home, Melrose, was a center of the city's social life, where guests such as Governor William G. Brownlow, presidential candidate John Bell, and Civil War generals John G. Foster and Ulysses S. Grant were entertained.

In the early 1870s. Temple was educated at the East Tennessee Female Institute in Knoxville, where she was classmates with the painter Adelia Armstrong Lutz. She then attended Vassar College, graduating with a bachelor of arts in 1877. She spent several years travelling with her ailing mother in search of healthier climates. The two spent time in Europe and the Catskills.

In 1885, Temple was elected first president of the Ossoli Circle, a women's literary club founded that year by activist Lizzie Crozier French. The following year, she published a biography of the club's namesake, entitled Sketch of Margaret Fuller Ossoli, which she read before the club. She was later a cofounder of two other literary societies, the Tennessee Woman's Press and Author's Club (1899) and the Knoxville Writer's Club (1907). In 1912, she edited and published Notable Men of Tennessee, a collection of biographies written by her late father.

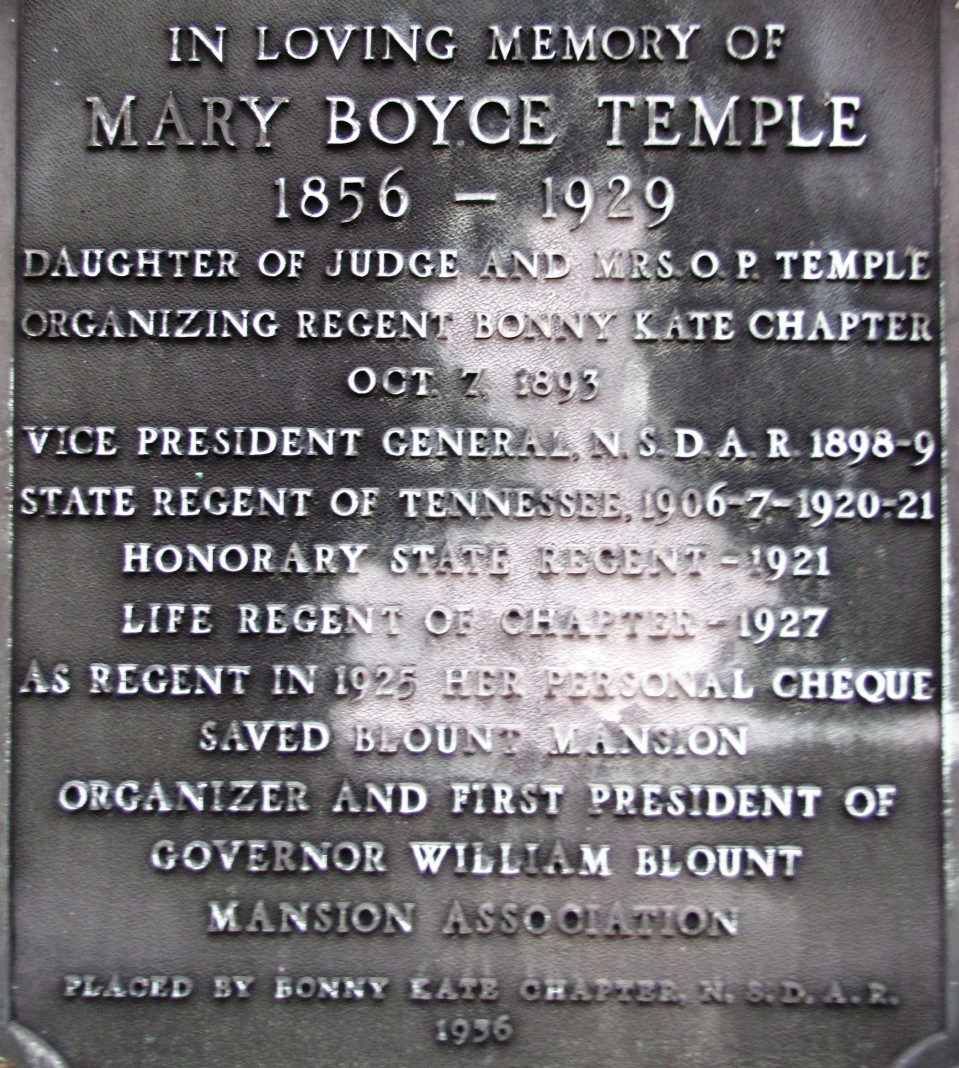
DAR plaque on the Temple obelisk at Old Gray Cemetery

In 1893, Temple organized the Bonny Kate Chapter of the Daughters of the American Revolution, named for Catherine "Bonny Kate" Sherill, the second wife of Tennessee frontiersman John Sevier. She served as regent of this chapter until her death in 1929, with the exception of a couple of years when she was the state DAR regent. She also served as a vice president-general in the DAR's national organization.

In 1900, Governor Benton McMillin appointed Temple to represent Tennessee at the Paris Exposition of that year. She also represented the state at international expositions in Stockholm and Rio de Janeiro, and at the opening of the Panama Canal in 1903. She was the lone woman on the Jury of Higher Education at the St. Louis World's Fair in 1904, and helped organize Knoxville's National Conservation Exposition in 1913.

In 1919, Temple donated $25,000 to the University of Tennessee for the establishment of a plant research foundation in memory of her father. This project developed seed for the state's Farmer's Convention. In 1925, Temple raised $35,000 for the purchase of Blount Mansion, the home of early territorial governor and Constitutional Convention delegate William Blount, which had been threatened with demolition. Her efforts are often considered the beginning of the preservation movement in Knoxville.

An ardent suffragist, Temple was president of Knox County's chapter of the League of Women Voters in the early 1920s. She spent her later years entertaining guests at her Knoxville home, and (during winters) at the Mayflower and Willard hotels in Washington, D.C. She died at her house on Hill Avenue in Downtown Knoxville in 1929. Librarian Mary Utopia Rothrock, in a brief biography of Temple in her book, The French Broad-Holston Country, wrote, "Many interesting legends cluster about Miss Temple and her social reign for four decades of Knoxville history."

== Mary Boyce Temple House ==
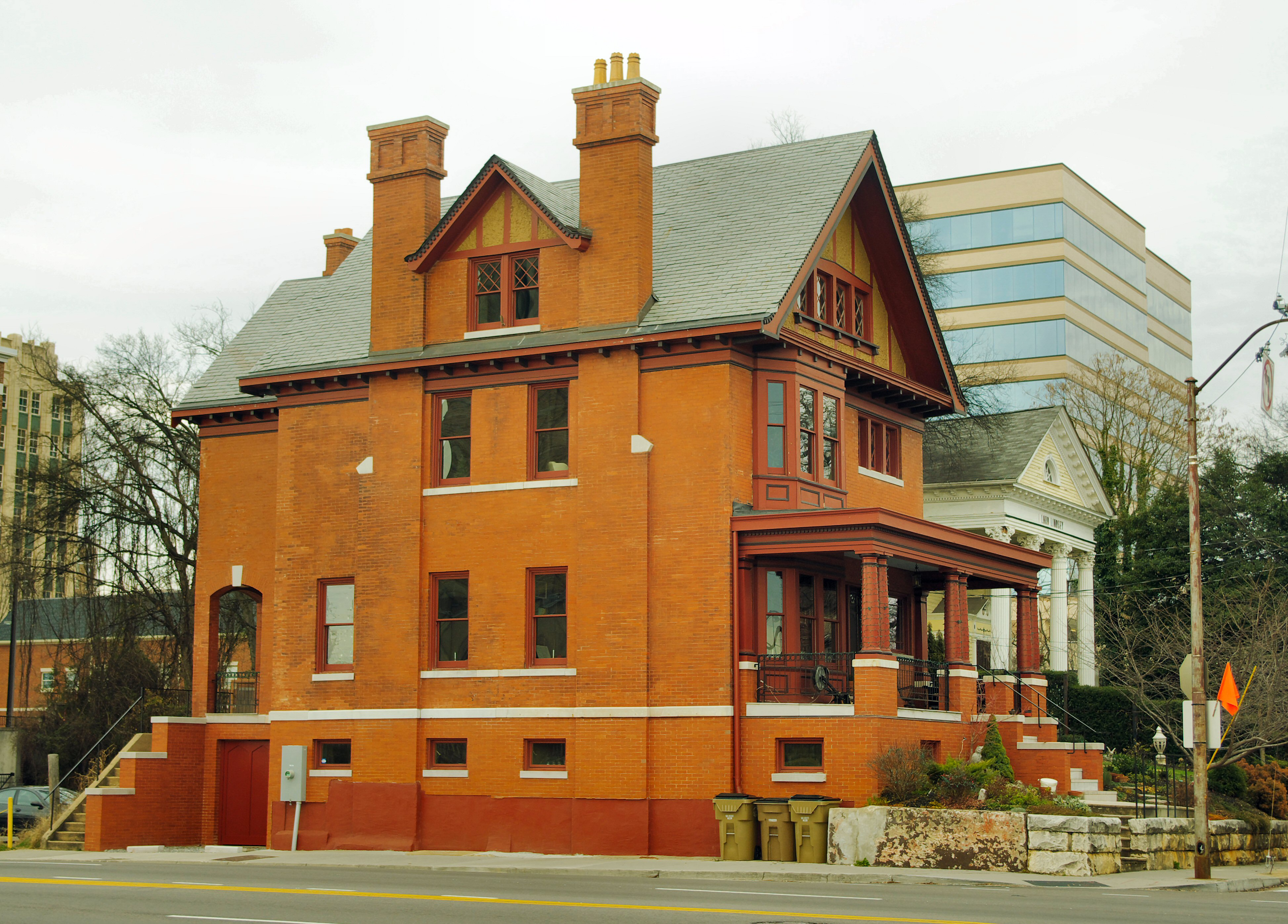
The Mary Boyce Temple House

The Mary Boyce Temple House, located at 623 Hill Avenue in Knoxville, is the last single-family residence in the city's downtown area. This house was built in 1907, and originally occupied by the Chambliss family. Temple, who had lived for many years with her father in a house built around 1830 by William Park at the corner of Market Street and Cumberland (no longer standing), bought the house now named for her in 1922, and died in the house in 1929. After a series of ownership changes and modifications over the decades, the house, threatened with demolition, was purchased in 2006 by Brian Pittman, who has since taken steps to renovate and restore it.

The two-story house exhibits design elements of Queen Anne and Tudor Revival styles. It retains its original exterior brick, iron, and woodwork, as well as many of its original interior elements, including an oak staircase. The main floor consists of a foyer, parlor, dining room, kitchen, pantry, office, and powder room, while the second floor includes three bedrooms, a nursery, and bathrooms. The house includes a Colonial Revival style porch, bay windows in the parlor and master bedroom, and three chimneys.

In October 2010, the Southern Paranormal and Anomaly Research Society (SPARS) conducted a paranormal investigation of the house in response to reports of paranormal activity by restoration workers.
