= East Tennessee Female Institute =

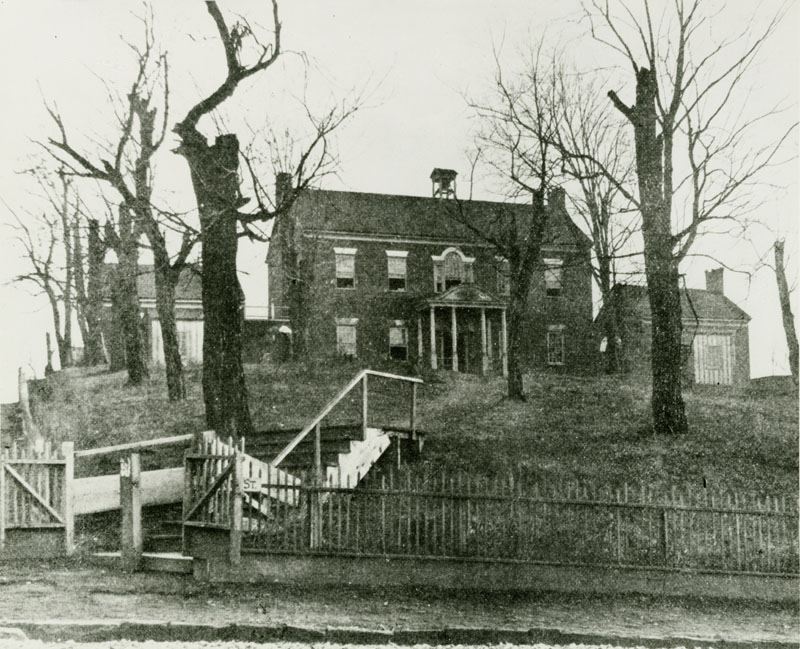
- Knoxville, Tennessee

Information
- School type: Female seminary
- Religious affiliation: Methodist Episcopal Church
- Established: May 7, 1827
- Closed: 1911

The East Tennessee Female Institute was an all-female institution of higher learning that operated in Knoxville, Tennessee, United States, from 1827 until 1911. Originally chartered as the Knoxville Female Academy, the school offered high school and college-level courses to the women of Knoxville and surrounding counties in the years before the University of Tennessee became coeducational. With the rise of free public education in Knoxville in the early 1900s, enrollment at the institute, which was tuition-based, gradually declined.

== History ==
=== Knoxville Female Academy ===
Blount College, the forerunner of the University of Tennessee, was chartered in 1794, and was originally open to both male and female students.

By the time it was rechartered as East Tennessee College in 1807, however, it was an all-male institution, and Knoxville's leaders began making preparations to establish a school for the city's young women. The Knoxville Female Academy was chartered in 1811, but its trustees struggled for several years to raise enough money to hire faculty and rent a building in which to conduct classes.

In 1826, East Tennessee College made a much-publicized move to a permanent location atop Barbara Hill, and interest in the Knoxville Female Academy was reinvigorated. In April of the following year, the Knoxville Register called on the city's leaders to revive the academy, and by the end of the month the school's trustees had hired faculty (a principal and two instructors) and had made arrangements to hold classes in the home of physician and trustee Joseph Strong. The Reverend John Davis was named the first principal, and classes began on May 7, 1827.

In 1828, the school's trustees began raising funds for a permanent school building. Strong and Matthew McClung each donated their halves of the lot bounded by what is now Henley, Main, and Hill Avenue, while Charles McClung, John Crozier, and several lesser donors contributed money for the building, which was completed in 1829. After Davis resigned, Strong secured the services of Dartmouth graduate Joseph Estabrook, who led the academy until 1834 when he resigned to become president of East Tennessee College. The Knoxville Female Academy graduated its first class on September 30, 1831.

=== East Tennessee Female Institute ===
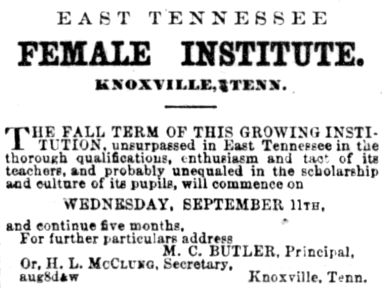
1872 ad for the East Tennessee Female Institute

In 1841, the Methodist Episcopal Church took over patronage of the academy, and the Reverend David McAnally was installed as principal. McAnally helped to greatly increase the school's collections, and the school continued to grow under his leadership.

On January 31, 1846, the Knoxville Female Academy was rechartered as the East Tennessee Female Institute, which had the power to confer degrees. Around the same time, the school's trustees began squabbling with the church's representatives, and the board voted to sever ties with the church in 1847.

During the 1850s, two East Tennessee College faculty— George Cooke and R. L. Kirkpatrick— served as principals of the East Tennessee Female Institute. The latter became principal in 1856, and endeavored to keep the institute open amidst the American Civil War in the early 1860s.The Union Army closed the school in late 1863 and used the school building as a hospital. The school reopened in 1866, and operated under various superintendents until 1877, when the building was leased to Knoxville for use as a public school.

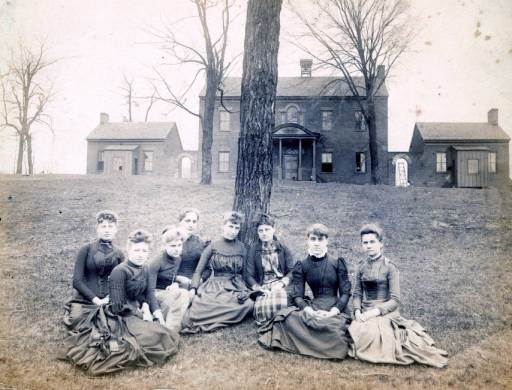
East Tennessee Female Institute in the 1880s; Lizzie Crozier French, head of the school, is on the far left

In 1885, suffragist Lizzie Crozier French and her sister, Lucy, leased the building and reopened the East Tennessee Female Institute. Along with classical subjects, Crozier-French stressed public speaking, and published a text, A Manual of Elocution, for her students. During this period, the Ossoli Circle, a women's club founded by Crozier-French in 1885, held its initial meetings at the institute. The Crozier sisters operated the school until 1890, when the trustees voted to sell the property.

=== Later years ===
In 1892, the East Tennessee Female Institute, which had been renamed the East Tennessee Institute and School of Music, began classes in a new building on Main Street. Under the leadership of Professor Charles Ross and a new faculty, the school's enrollment grew to over 100 by 1894. William Rule's Standard History of Knoxville, published in 1900, described the school as having "large, well lighted and ventilated" rooms that were "well supplied with apparatus, books and maps for teaching languages, sciences, art and history."

With the rise of free public education in Knoxville in the late 19th century, the institute had difficulty attracting students willing to pay tuition. In 1911, the school closed, and its building was leased to the University of Tennessee Home Economics Department. In 1919, the school's trustees made a deed of gift of the building to the University, which for several years used the building for its College of Law.

== Curriculum ==
For most of its history, the East Tennessee Female Institute offered a mix of classical studies and "ornamental" studies. During Estabrook's tenure in the 1830s, first-year students learned spelling, reading, geography, and arithmetic. These subjects were continued in the second year, with grammar and mythology added. Third-year students studied history, natural philosophy, rhetoric and botany, while senior students studied astronomy, chemistry, philosophy, and logic. Ornamental subjects included music (mainly piano), painting, drawing, lace making and sewing. After it was rechartered as the East Tennessee Female Institute in 1846, the school conferred "Mistress of Polite Literature" degrees upon its graduates.

Students were required to give weekly recitations on Biblical scripture, and bi-weekly recitations on other subjects. Public examinations were given twice per year, and were often attended by members of the public and covered by the city's newspapers.

== Notable alumni ==
- Jane Franklin Hommel Denney (1878–1946), clubwoman
- Adelia Armstrong Lutz (1859–1931), painter
- Mary Boyce Temple (1856–May 16, 1929), philanthropist and socialite

== See also ==
- Asheville Female College
