= James C. Luttrell =

American politician

Mayor of Knoxville, Tennessee
- In office 1854–1855
- Preceded by: George M. White
- Succeeded by: William G. Swan
- In office 1859–1867
- Preceded by: A.M. Piper
- Succeeded by: Marcus D. Bearden

Personal details
- Born: James Churchwell Luttrell; March 3, 1813 Knox County, Tennessee, USA
- Died: July 6, 1878 (aged 65) Nashville, Tennessee, USA
- Party: Whig; Know-Nothing; Democratic
- Spouse: Eliza Carr Bell
- Education: East Tennessee College
- Occupation: Attorney

James Churchwell Luttrell II (March 3, 1813 – July 6, 1878) was an American attorney and politician who served as Mayor of Knoxville, Tennessee, during the Civil War. His eight-year term (1859–1867) was the longest for any Knoxville mayor until the late 20th century, when it was surpassed by Victor Ashe's 16-year term. Luttrell also served as state comptroller in the late 1850s, and was elected to the state senate following his term as mayor.

== Biography ==
Luttrell was born in rural Knox County, Tennessee, the son of prominent Knox County merchant James C. Luttrell, Sr., and Martha Armstrong. Armstrong's brother and nephew built Crescent Bend and the Bleak House, respectively, both of which still stand on Kingston Pike. Luttrell graduated from East Tennessee College (the forerunner of the University of Tennessee) in 1832, and commenced practicing law a short time later. Luttrell was elected Register of Knox County in 1848, and was appointed postmaster of Knoxville by President Millard Fillmore in 1849.

Luttrell was first elected mayor in 1854, and during this brief term helped oversee Knoxville's acquisition of Market Square. In 1855, the Know Nothings, with whom Luttrell had aligned after the collapse of the Whig Party, captured several seats in the Tennessee state legislature, and managed to appoint Luttrell comptroller. Luttrell served in this capacity until 1858, when he was again elected Mayor of Knoxville.

In many ways, the Luttrell household epitomized the divided sentiments of Civil War-era Knoxville. Luttrell himself supported the Union, and his son, Samuel, fought for the Union Army. However, his two other sons, John and James, Jr., both fought for the Confederate Army. In spite of Luttrell's Union sentiments, he was reelected mayor of Confederate-occupied Knoxville in 1862. Historian Oliver Perry Temple recalled that when Union forces occupied Knoxville in September 1863, Luttrell unfurled a large American flag at the corner of Main Street and Gay Street he had painstakingly saved for such an occasion.

After the war, Luttrell joined the Democratic Party, complicating his electability in heavily-Republican post-war East Tennessee. He was finally defeated in the mayoral election of 1866 by Knoxville businessman Marcus De Lafayette Bearden. Luttrell was elected to the state senate in 1869, but served just one two-year term. He died while visiting an associate in Nashville in 1878.

== See also ==
- Thomas William Humes
- William Graham Swan
