= William Graham Swan =

American politician (c.1821–1869)

Confederate Congressman from Tennessee
- In office February 18, 1862 – March 18, 1865
- Preceded by: New office
- Succeeded by: End of office

Mayor of Knoxville, Tennessee
- In office 1855–1856
- Preceded by: James C. Luttrell
- Succeeded by: James H. Cowan

Personal details
- Born: c. 1821 Probably East Tennessee or Alabama
- Died: April 12, 1869 Memphis, Tennessee
- Resting place: Elmwood Cemetery
- Party: Whig; Democratic Party
- Spouse: Margaret Paralee Mabry
- Education: East Tennessee College
- Profession: Lawyer

William Graham Swan (c. 1821 – April 12, 1869) was an American attorney and politician active primarily in East Tennessee during the mid-19th century. Swan served in the Confederate States Congress during the American Civil War, and served one term as mayor of Knoxville, Tennessee, from 1855 until late 1856. He also helped establish the town of East Knoxville (later annexed by Knoxville), and served as its first mayor in the late 1850s. In 1854, Swan and his brother-in-law, Joseph Mabry, donated the initial land for the formation of Market Square in downtown Knoxville.

== Biography ==
=== Early life ===
Swan's early life is obscure, but he was likely born in East Tennessee or Alabama. He graduated from East Tennessee College (now the University of Tennessee) in 1838, and studied law afterward. By 1843, he had a law office on Gay Street in Knoxville, and he attended courts in Knox, Anderson, Roane, Campbell, and Claiborne counties. He served as Attorney General of Tennessee 1851 until 1853.

=== 1850s ===
Throughout the early 1850s, Swan speculated in land along the periphery of Knoxville, especially in what is now East Knoxville, which he helped develop. In 1854, he and his brother-in-law Joseph A. Mabry purchased several acres of land then located north of Knoxville (the boundary at the time being Union Avenue). They donated a portion of this land to the city for creation of a Market House, laying the foundation for what is now Market Square. That same year, Swan and William Montgomery Churchwell founded the Knoxville Gas Light Company, which installed the first gas lights on Gay Street.

Swan was elected Mayor of Knoxville in 1854, succeeding James C. Luttrell, and served in this capacity from 1855 through most of 1856. He made a number of progressive proposals, including the construction of a tunnel to allow development over the railroad, and the digging of a canal between First Creek and Second Creek to give factories navigable access to the Tennessee River (both proposals were rejected). A measure was also passed during Swan's tenure that attempted to rein in the city's growing number of noisy saloons by giving the city recorder the authority to close saloons for an indefinite period of time.

In 1855, Swan met John Mitchel, an Irish nationalist visiting in Knoxville while in exile. Swan and Mitchel established a radical newspaper, the Southern Citizen, in 1857. This newspaper defended the South and the practice of slavery, and went so far as to call for the reopening of the Atlantic slave trade.

In 1856, Swan was elected the first mayor of East Knoxville, which he had helped incorporate the previous year. Swan served as the new city's mayor until 1859. East Knoxville was annexed by Knoxville in 1868.

=== Civil War ===
In the years leading up the Civil War, Swan was a staunch secessionist. Radical pro-Unionist William "Parson" Brownlow, whose Knoxville Whig had been quarreling with the Knoxville Register (which was co-owned by Swan) since the early 1850s, stepped up his attacks on Swan, calling him an unprincipled politician who had defected to the Democratic Party only after being snubbed by the Whigs. When Brownlow was arrested by Confederate authorities in late 1861, Swan wrote a letter to Jefferson Davis demanding that Brownlow be hanged.

Swan was elected to the First Confederate Congress in November 1861, having easily defeated Knoxville attorney John Baxter, and was reelected in 1863. As a congressman, Swan proposed high import taxes on European nations that refused to recognize the Confederacy, rejected federal taxation, and rejected the arming of slaves. In 1864, Swan made national headlines when he attacked fellow Tennessee congressman Henry S. Foote, who had criticized Swan's friend, John Mitchel.

After the war, Swan settled in Memphis, Tennessee, where he practiced law. He died of consumption on April 12, 1869, and was interred in Elmwood Cemetery the same day.

Legal offices
Preceded by West Hughes Humphreys	Attorney General of Tennessee; 1854–1859	Succeeded by John L.T. Sneed
