= Lena B. Mathes =

American educator, temperance reformer (1861–1951)

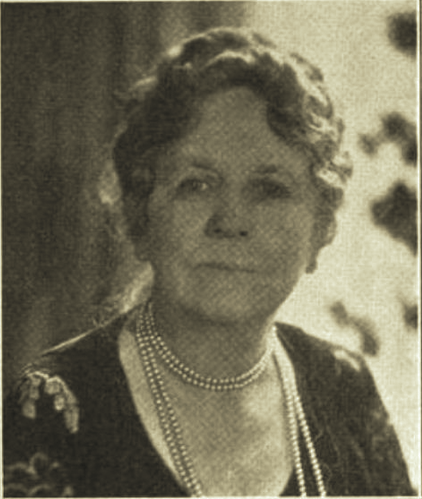

Personal life
- Born: Lena Boyce Mays; October 27, 1861 Talladega, Alabama, U.S.
- Died: July 28, 1951 (aged 89) Washington, D.C.
- Resting place: Old Gray Cemetery, Knoxville, Tennessee, U.S.
- Spouse: George McCown Mathes (m. 1884–1906)
- Children: 2 sons
- Parent: Rev. John Fleming Bingham Mays (father)
- Education: University of Chicago

Religious life
- Religion: Christianity
- Denomination: Baptist

Lena B. Mathes (née, Mays; 1861–1951) was an American educator, social reformer, and ordained Baptist minister. She was a pioneer organizer of schools in rural districts of the south. Her principal work, however, was organizing church women for intelligent, informed citizenship and for the purpose of arousing them to their duty at the polls. Mathes lectured for on current, religious, social and civic subjects, specializing on subjects connected with juvenile delinquency, the relation of the church to the community, problems on international relations as well as current legislative measures relating to the moral and religious welfare of the community and the welfare of women and children. Mathes was the author of pamphlets on subjects under discussion in her work and frequently contributed articles to papers and magazines relating to her work.

== Early life and education ==
Lena Boyce Mays was born at Talladega, Alabama, October 27, 1861. Her parents were Rev. John Fleming Bingham Mays (1827–1883), a Baptist minister, and Sarah R. (Durham) Mays (b. 1839). On her mother's side, there was a long line of ministers and missionaries of English ancestry in Virginia.

Mathes was brought up in the Old South and her early education was received under tutors at home. She was graduated at Salem Academy (Winston-Salem, North Carolina) and later studied for a number of years in the University of Chicago receiving the degrees Ph. B. (1911), A. M. (1912), and B. D. (1914), where she specialized in sociology and religious education. Her M.A. thesis was titled, "English and History in the Rural School as Material for Religious Education."

== Career ==
=== Educator ===
For 22 years (1886–1908), she was engaged in teaching in Florida and North Carolina. Four years, she was a teacher of Ecclesiastical Sociology in the Baptist Training School.

In 1901, she was on the faculty of Stetson University. After rumors started spreading regarding possible inappropriate behavior between Mathes and John Forbes, the married president of Stetson University, multiple lawsuits for libel were filed.

By 1905, she had left Stetson University and was selected to start teaching at Turkey Creek School in Hillsborough County, Florida. But the children of the school asked the courts for an injunction to restrain her from teaching them, charging drunknenness and other acts of immorality on the part of Mathes. Some of the acts complained dated 10 or 12 years back. They included the Stetson scandal of three years earlier when Mathes, then a teacher in the Stetson University, and Rev. John F. Forbes, president of the institution, were charged with improper conduct, and left the university. Rarely, if ever in the U.S., and never before in Florida had a teacher been removed from her position by the summary legal process of an injunction restraining her from exercising her duties and powers, the most remarkable part of it being that the suit was brought in the name of the pupils who had been deprived of an education by their parents refusing to send them to a school taught by Mathes.

=== Social reformer ===
At the age of twenty, she joined the Woman's Christian Temperance Union (WCTU), and thereafter devoted a considerable portion of her time to the organization of local branches and Legions of Honor.

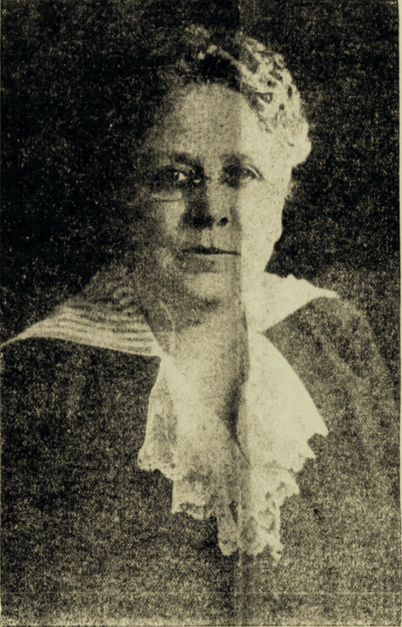
(1921)

In 1914, together with a number of women with whom she had been associated at the University of Chicago, she organized the Woman's Church Federation, of which she became first president. As president of the Woman's Church Federation, which was really an adjunct of a department of the WCTU, whose object was to secure the Sunday closing of the saloons of Chicago through the cooperation of the business and professional men of the city, Mathes assisted materially in securing the Chicago Dry Petition in March 1918. Largely due to her efforts, the women of 18 denominations were enlisted in the work of the Federation and thousands of leading citizens of the city were induced to bring pressure to bear on the Chicago city government. Mathes also led a crusade to force the city newspapers to exclude liquor advertisements. She was the Federation's president for eight years. She organized similar federations in other towns and cities in Illinois and Kentucky.

Also in Chicago, Mathes became ordained as a Baptist minister by the American Baptist Convention.

Mathes served on the Law Enforcement Committee, the Legislative Committee, and the Social Hygiene Committee of the Council of National Defense. When World War I was declared, the Woman's Church Federation was the first woman's organization to establish an office at the headquarters of the Council of Defense.

From 1921, she was superintendent of the Woman's Department of the Anti-Saloon League of Illinois. She was an active speaker for law enforcement and the election of prohibition-mind men to the Illinois State Legislature. She was active in all civic and social improvements in Chicago and was particularly interested in labor problems, prohibition and international friendship. She was Director of the Illinois Christian Citizenship Council and a member of the Board of Directors of the following organizations: Illinois Civic League; Illinois Vigilance Association; Women's International League for Peace and Freedom; and Illinois League of Women Voters. Mathes was a member of the Woodlawn Baptist Church. She held membership in the following organizations: Anti-Saloon League of Illinois (Superintendent of Women's department of Illinois); Chicago Church Federation (Member of the board of trustees; Vice Chair of its commissions on World Friendship and Political Action); United Daughters of the Confederacy; WCTU; Women's Trade Union League; Woman's City Club; Chicago College Club; American Association of University Women; Chicago Woman's Club and American Sociological Society. In her endeavor to link the church with important work through cooperation, she came to occupy positions in other women's organizations and served on committees of the various Boards of Relief – the Near East, Feeding of the German Children, and the American Committee for the Relief of Russian Women and Children.

== Personal life ==
She married Capt. George McCown Mathes (1837–1906), of Sevierville, Tennessee, on April 5, 1884. They had two sons, Yorick and John.

Lena B. Mathes died on July 28, 1951, at her home in Washington, D.C. Burial was at the Old Gray Cemetery, Knoxville, Tennessee.

== Selected works ==
- "A Job for Illinois Women", 1921
- "Organizing Women Voters for Victory", 1930
