= Lawson McGhee Library =

Library in Knoxville, Tennessee

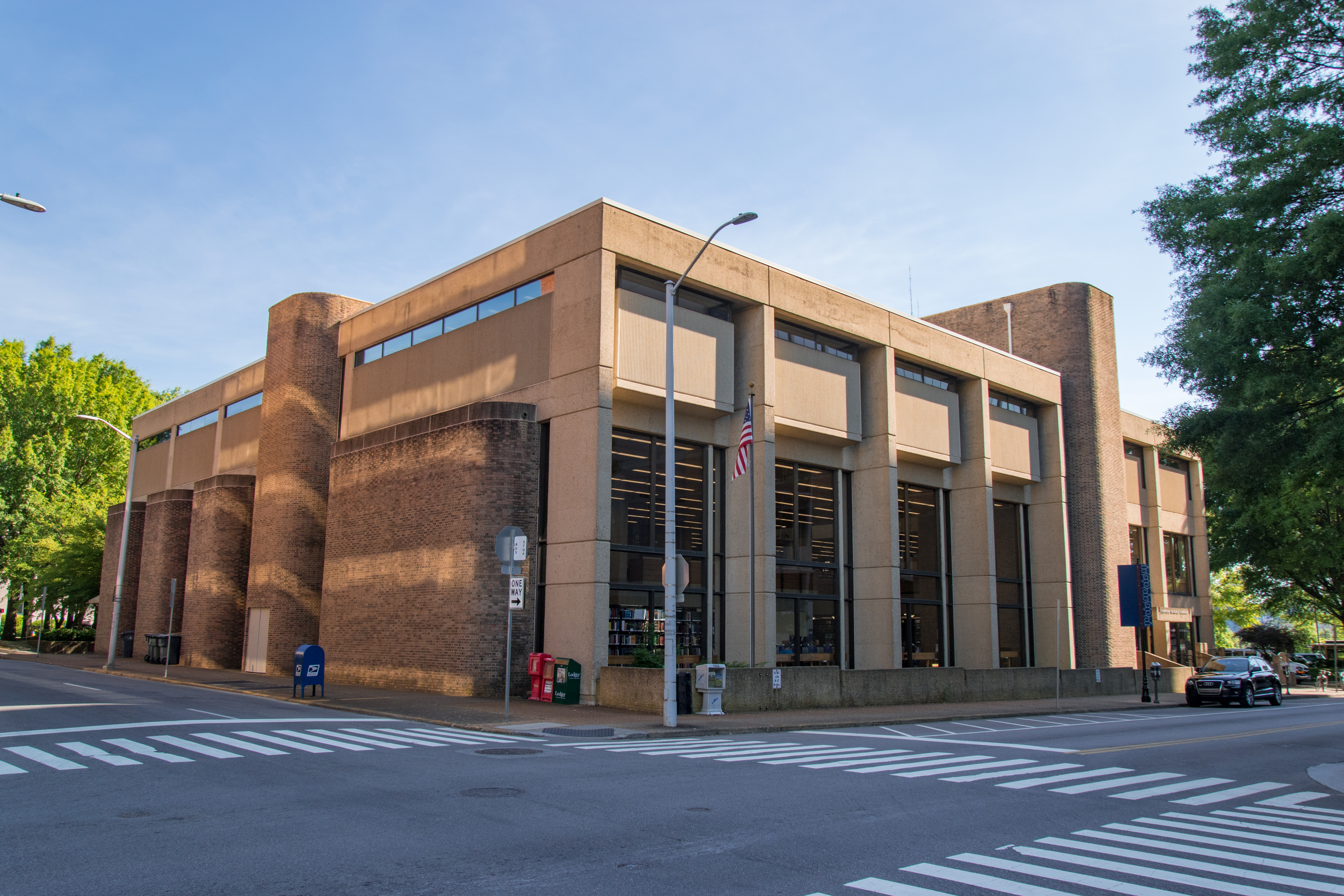
- 35.962290°N 83.919476°W
- Location: 500 West Church Avenue, Knoxville, Tennessee
- Type: Public

Other information
- Website: www.knoxlib.org

The Lawson McGhee Library is the main library of Knox County Public Library in Knoxville, Tennessee. It is located at 500 West Church Avenue in downtown Knoxville. It is currently the oldest, continuously operating public library in Tennessee.

== History ==
The library was established in 1885 with a $50,000 donation from Knoxville businessman Charles McClung McGhee, and named for McGhee's daughter, May Lawson McGhee, who had died suddenly in 1883. The library was initially located on the second floor of the Rebori Building. This was due to the first floor being purposefully occupied by several businesses, so the library could have income from the business' commercial use of the floor. It had a collection of 4,000-6,000 books. In 1904, the library burned from a fire and was forced to move. Because the income from the building's businesses was still available after its recovery from the fire, the library was able to maintain and improve at a new site, now under the city as Lawson McGhee Library, without financial issue. The city's public library system opened in 1916 and the building of the library's new location was finished in 1917.

Despite its status as a free public library, the municipal Lawson McGhee Library only served white patrons, leading to the formation of an additional segregated library branch. With $10,000 donated by Andrew Carnegie in 1916, the Free Colored Library opened in Knoxville on 1918 and was governed by the Lawson McGhee's board. It would eventually close in 1961. Another segregated branch, the Murphy Branch Library, opened in 1930.

Years prior to this library opening, in 1817, a group of forty-eight Knoxville residents established the Knoxville Library Company, the city’s first organized library, and the earliest formal library initiative in East Tennessee. The subscription-based library, incorporated by the Tennessee legislature, was open to members on Saturday afternoons and offered books on subjects such as botany, rhetoric, biography, and exploration. Though records are limited, the library flourished for at least seven years. There was only one woman among the 48 members, Margaret Cowan Humes Ramsey. Her love for books and education was passed on to her son Thomas William Humes, who became the Lawson McGhee Library's first hired librarian.

The library celebrated its 125th anniversary in 2011 with tours of the original location on the at the Rebori Building at 125 South Gay Street. Steve Cotham, the manager of the McClung Historical Collection of the Knox County Public Library, was there to provide information to guests.

The current Lawson McGhee Library building was designed by architect Bruce McCarty.

== Gallery ==
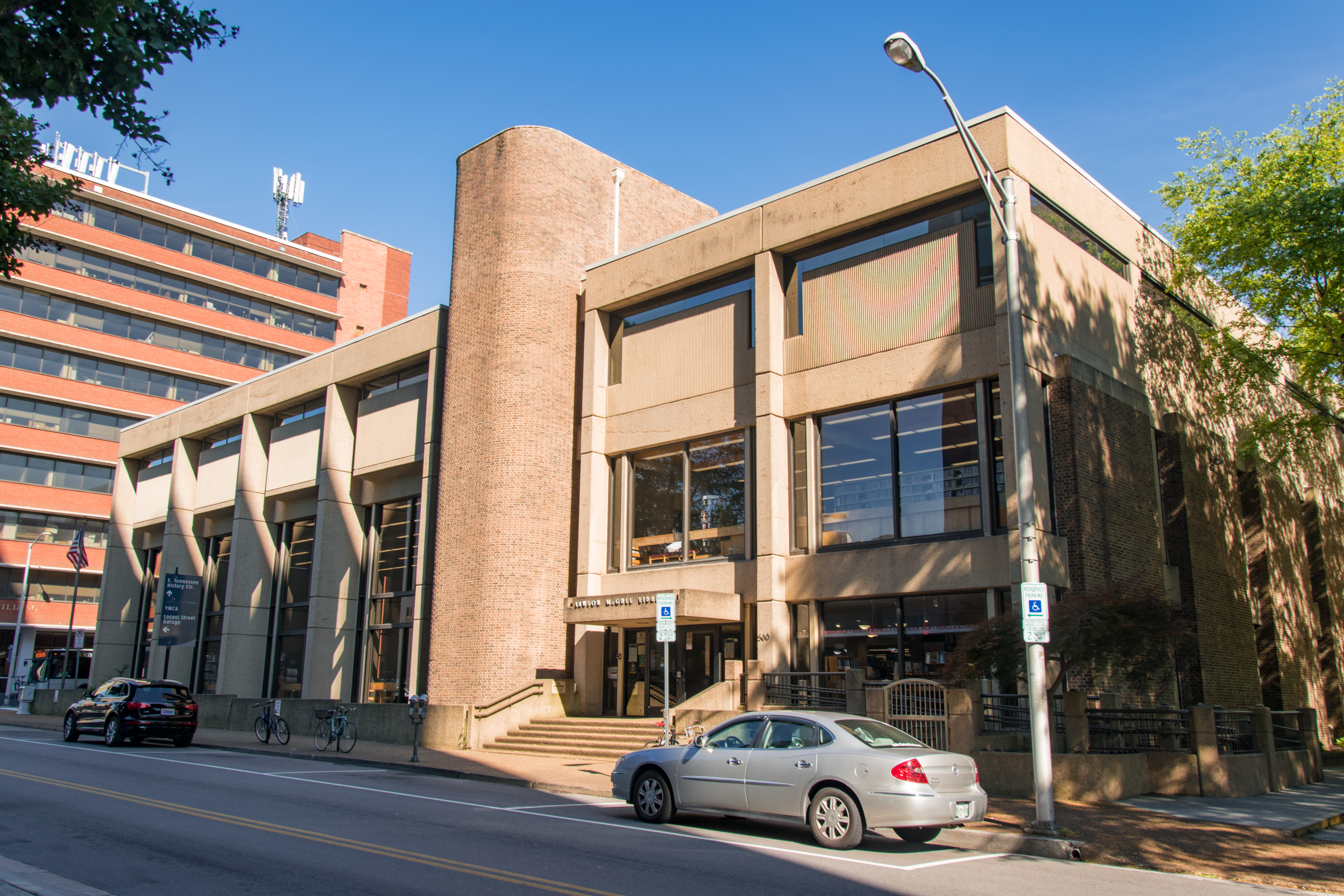

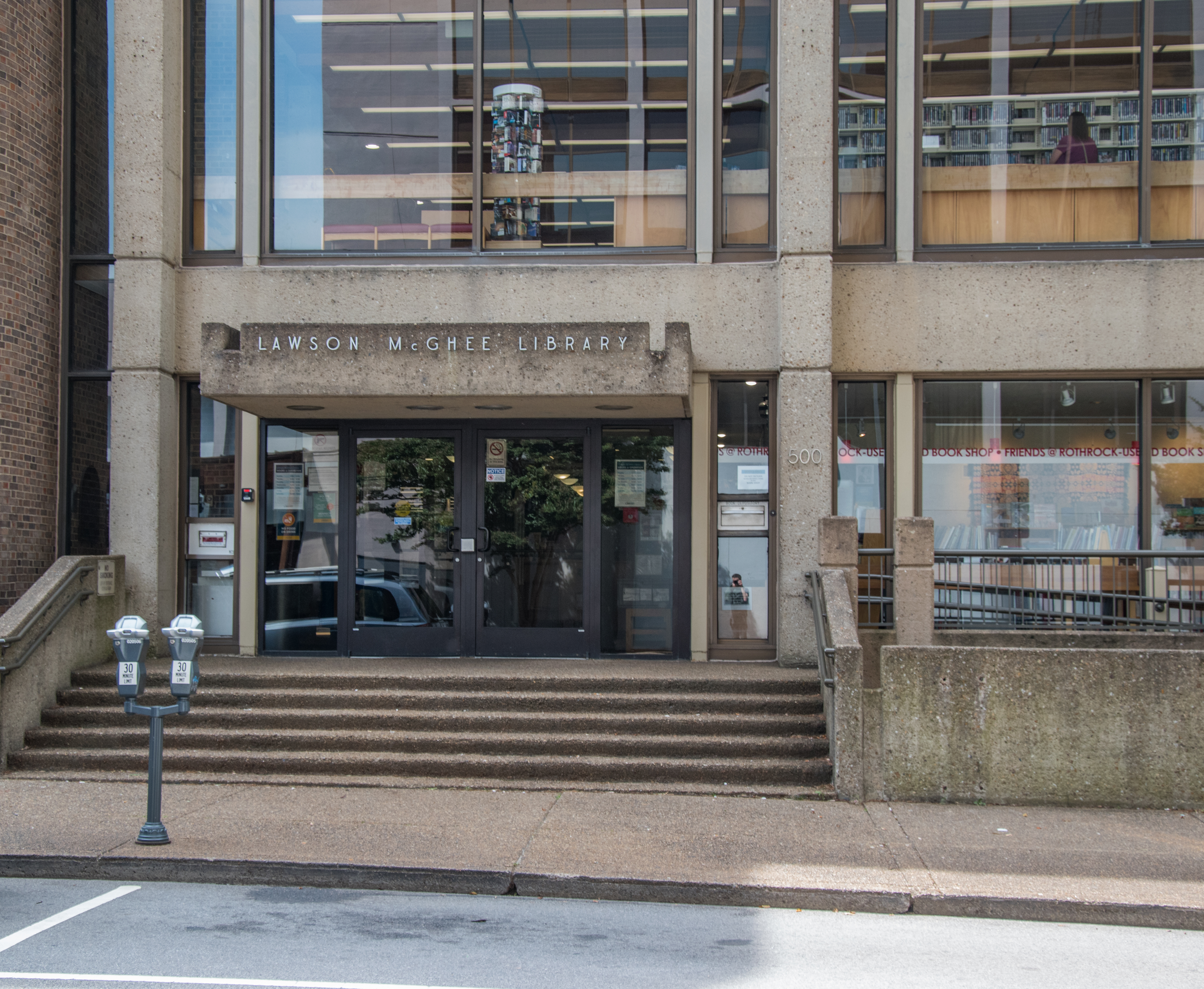

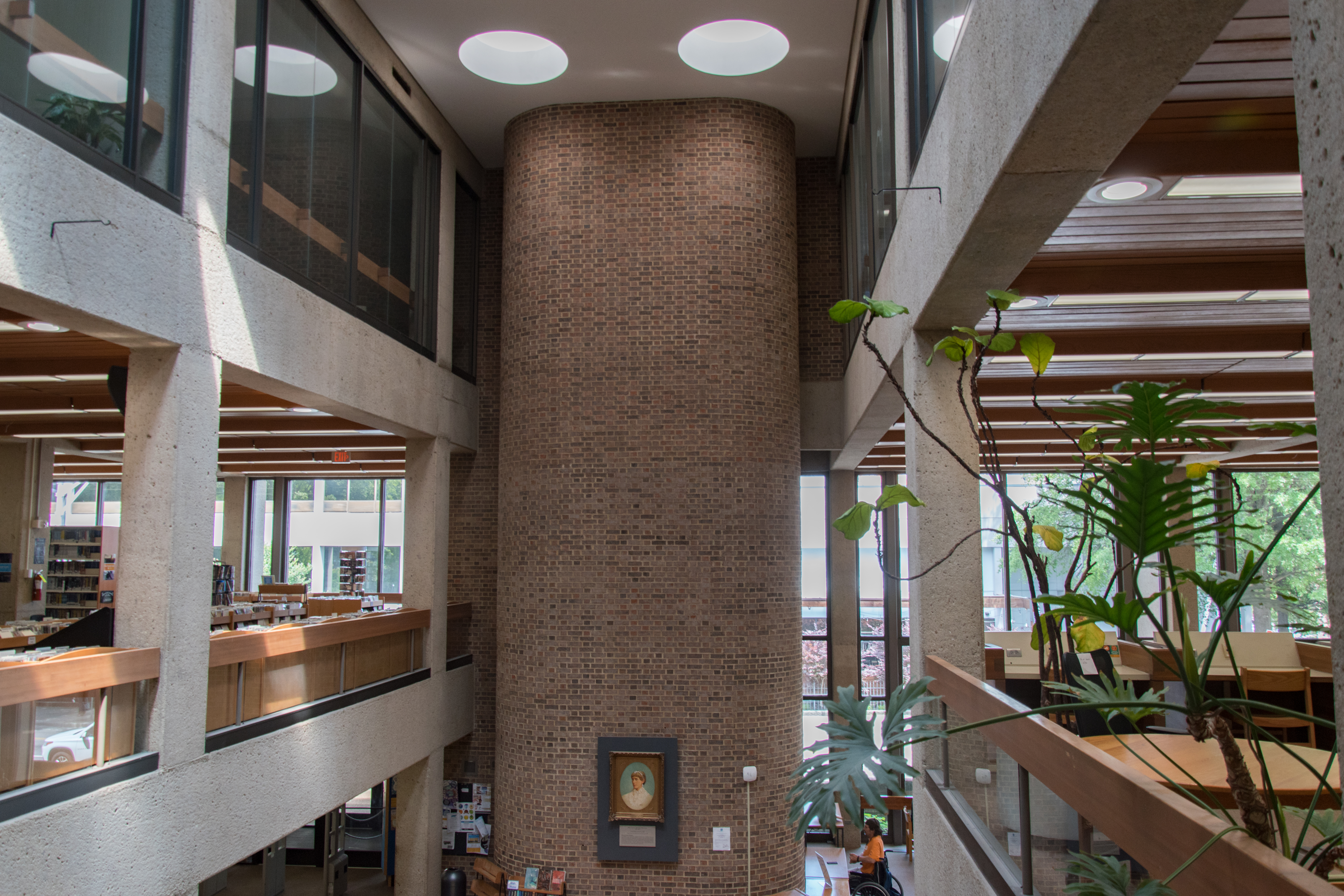

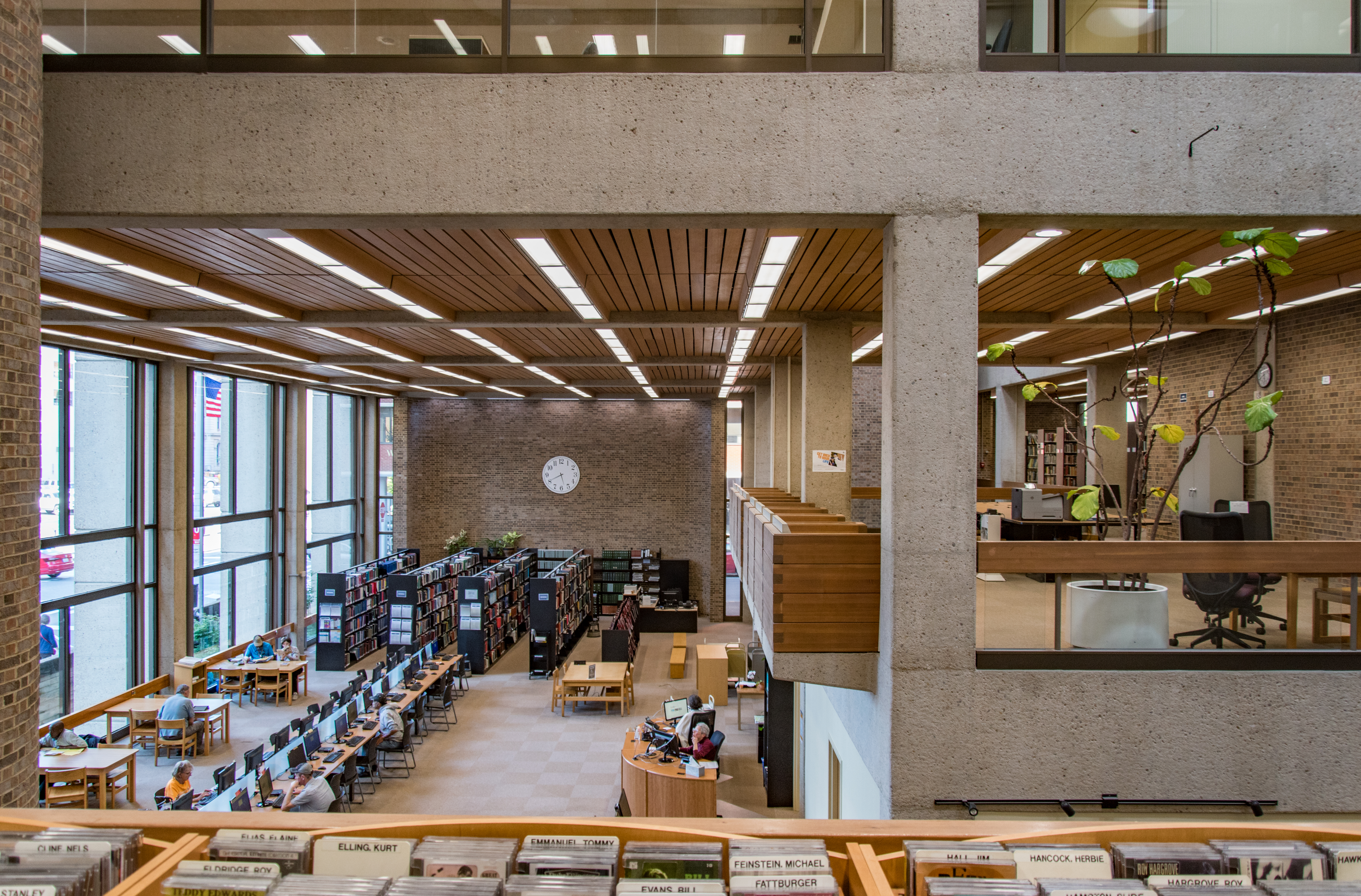

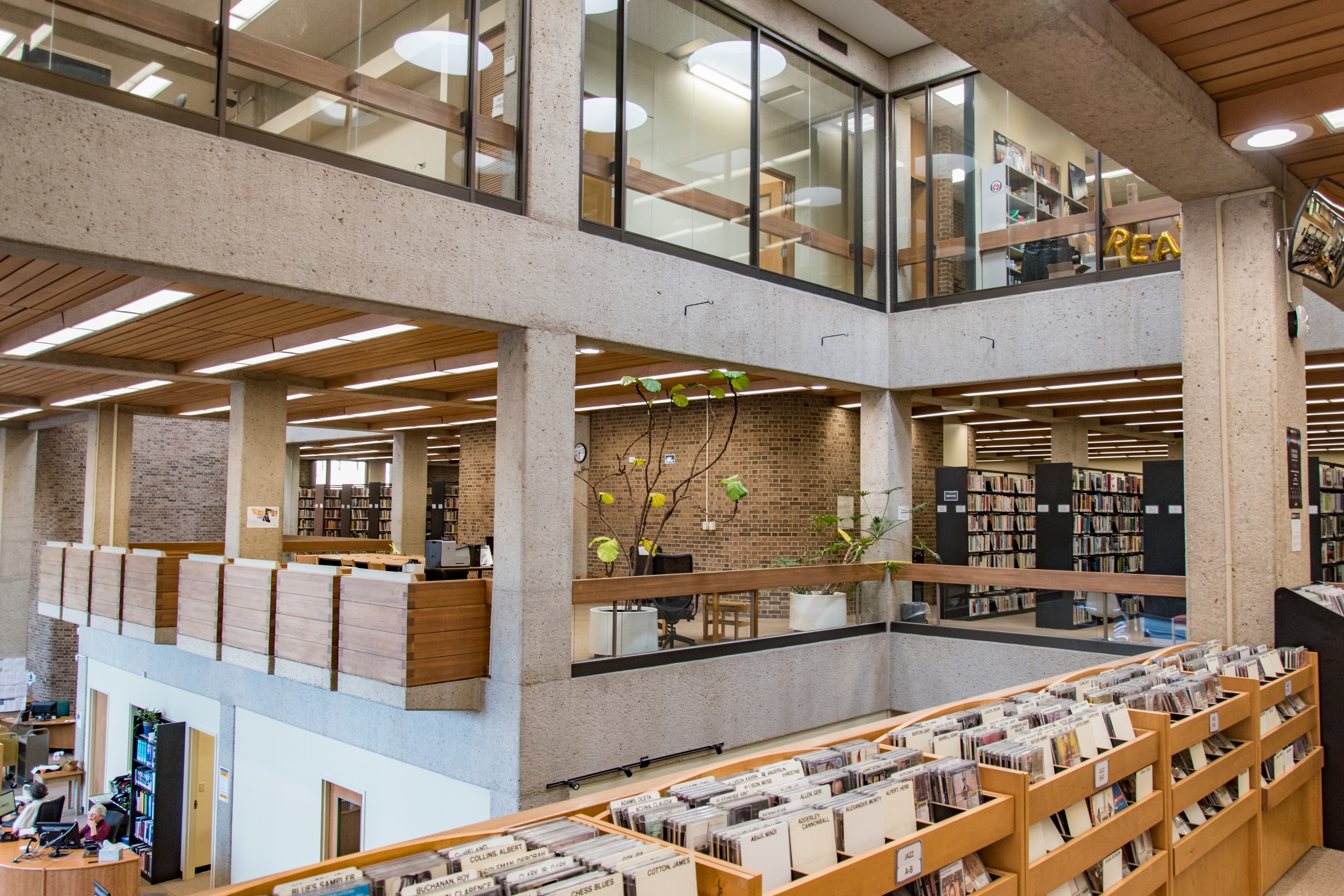
