= Thomas William Humes =

American politician

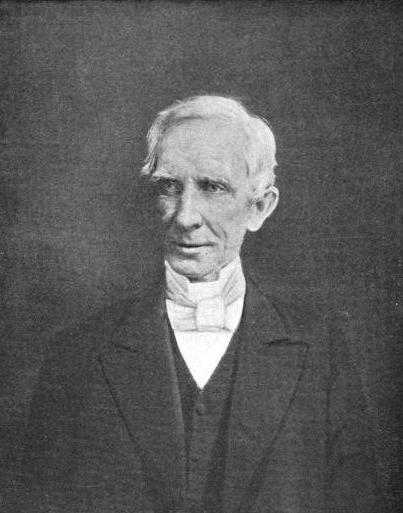
- Portrait of Thomas William Humes by artist Lloyd Branson
- Born: April 22, 1815; Knoxville, Tennessee, United States
- Died: January 16, 1892 (aged 76); Knoxville, Tennessee, US
- Resting place: Old Gray Cemetery, Knoxville
- Education: East Tennessee College
- Occupations: Clergyman, educator
- Notable work: The Loyal Mountaineers of Tennessee (1888)
- Political party: Whig; Republican
- Spouse(s): Cornelia Williams (1835–1847, her death); Anne Betsy Williams (1849–1879, her death)
- Parent(s): Thomas and Margaret Russell Cowan Humes

Thomas William Humes (April 22, 1815 – January 16, 1892) was an American clergyman and educator, active in Knoxville, Tennessee, during the latter half of the 19th century. Elected rector of St. John's Episcopal Church in 1846, Humes led the church until the outbreak of the Civil War, when he was forced to resign due to his Union sentiments. He was named president of East Tennessee University in 1865, and during his tenure, he led the school's expansion and transition into the University of Tennessee. Humes later served as the first librarian of the Lawson McGhee Library, and published a book about East Tennessee's Unionists entitled, The Loyal Mountaineers of Tennessee.

== Early life ==
Humes was born in Knoxville in 1815, the son of Thomas Humes (1767–1816) and Margaret Russell Cowan Humes (1777–1854), both of Scots-Irish descent. Humes's father, a native of Armagh, Ireland, began building the Lamar House Hotel in 1816, but died later that same year. Humes's mother oversaw the hotel's completion, however, and under her direction, it grew to become Knoxville's premier hotel. The younger Humes was a half-brother of James Cowan (1801–1871), a co-founder of the wholesaling firm, Cowan, McClung and Company, and a stepbrother of historian J. G. M. Ramsey (1797–1884).

Humes graduated from East Tennessee College (the forerunner of the University of Tennessee) in 1831, and obtained his master's degree from the school two years later. He then entered the Princeton Theological Seminary intending to become a Presbyterian minister but left after deciding he could not take the Westminster Confession of Faith. After returning to Knoxville, Humes briefly worked for his half-brother's business before embarking on a career in journalism. During the late 1830s and early 1840s, he worked variously as editor of the Knoxville Times, the Knoxville Register, and a Whig Party paper, The Watch Tower.

In the mid-1840s, Humes began studying under the authority of Tennessee's Episcopal Bishop James Otey (1800–1863). He initially served as Sunday lay reader for Knoxville's St. John's Episcopal Church congregation, and after being ordained a deacon in March 1845, he served as assistant to the church's rector. In July 1845, Humes was ordained a priest by Bishop Otey, and in September 1846, the congregation elected him rector.

== Civil War ==
Although he was a slave owner, Humes helped several slaves in Knoxville purchase their freedom during the late 1840s and 1850s. He also opened a school for Knoxville's free blacks and freed slaves. During the secession crisis of 1860 and 1861, Humes remained fervently loyal to the Union, even though many of his relatives and most of his congregation supported secession. After he refused to acknowledge Confederate president Jefferson Davis's National Day of Prayer in mid-1861, he was finally forced to resign.

After Tennessee seceded in June 1861, Humes wanted to move to the North, but a broken leg prevented him from doing so. Humes dubbed the Confederate occupation of Knoxville a "reign of terror," but remained in the city throughout the war, protected in part by his blood and marriage ties to many of the city's Confederate leaders. In June 1863, Humes prayed with dying Confederate Pleasant McClung, who had been mortally wounded in an attempted raid on the city by General William P. Sanders.

When General Ambrose Burnside's Union forces occupied Knoxville in September 1863, the general asked Humes to resume his position as rector of St. John's Episcopal Church, which Humes accepted. Confederate diarist Ellen Renshaw House, a member of the St. John's congregation, boycotted Humes's opening sermon, calling Humes "the grandest old rascal that ever was." In November 1863, Humes performed a funerary sermon for General Sanders, who had been mortally wounded by advancing Confederate forces in West Knoxville.

== Later life ==
Humes was named president of East Tennessee University in 1865, and almost immediately managed to secure an $18,500 (~$296,094 in 2024) federal grant to help restore the school's deteriorated campus, which had been occupied by both Union and Confederate armies during the war. In 1869, Tennessee's state government designated the school the recipient of the state's Morrill Act (land-grant) funds. This amounted to $400,000, which generated for the school $24,000 in annual interest. As required by the Morrill Act, the school established colleges of agriculture, engineering, and military science.

East Tennessee University changed its name to the University of Tennessee in 1879 in hopes of obtaining more state funding. Humes resigned as president in 1883, and was succeeded by Charles Dabney.

Throughout his later years, Humes used his influence to raise money for educational and economic development in East Tennessee. In 1864, he was elected chairman of the East Tennessee Relief Association, which raised money to help East Tennessee Unionists impoverished by the Civil War. During the late 1860s, he helped Knoxville obtain Peabody funding, which the city used to establish a public school system. In 1873, Humes co-founded the St. John's Orphanage, which operated in Knoxville into the 20th century. In 1886, Humes was named the first librarian of the Lawson McGhee Library, which had been established the previous year.

In 1888, Humes published Loyal Mountaineers of Tennessee, an account of the Civil War in East Tennessee. While Humes attempted to provide a dispassionate view of the war, he also hoped to justify the largely pro-Union sentiments of East Tennessee. He considered these sentiments a manifestation of the region's Revolutionary War patriotism, linking them to the penchant for independence the region had shown during the Watauga and State of Franklin periods. He criticized the actions of Confederate military leaders as tyrannical, while praising the actions of Union leaders such as Ambrose Burnside as just. The book includes Humes' eyewitness accounts of key wartime events in Knoxville, including the Battle of Fort Sanders and the aftermath of the East Tennessee bridge burnings.

== Death and legacy ==
Humes died on January 16, 1892, shortly after collapsing while working in the Lawson McGhee Library. His funeral was held at the Second Presbyterian Church, and his funeral procession was accompanied by University of Tennessee faculty and students. He is buried in Knoxville's Old Gray Cemetery.

Humes Hall, a residence hall on the campus of the University of Tennessee, is named for Humes. In 1983, Humes' Federal-style house in Knoxville, which had stood behind St. John's Episcopal Church for nearly 140 years, was torn down. Many of the house's fixtures were salvaged by preservationists, however, and the local group, Knox Heritage, has considered building a reproduced version of the house.

== See also ==
- James C. Luttrell
- Oliver Perry Temple
- Samuel Cole Williams
