= Ossoli Circle =

Women's club located in Knoxville, Tennessee

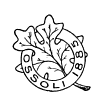
- Formation: November 20, 1885; 140 years ago
- Headquarters: Knoxville, Tennessee, USA
- Location: 2511 Kingston Pike
- Affiliations: General Federation of Women's Clubs
- Ossoli Circle Clubhouse
- U.S. National Register of Historic Places
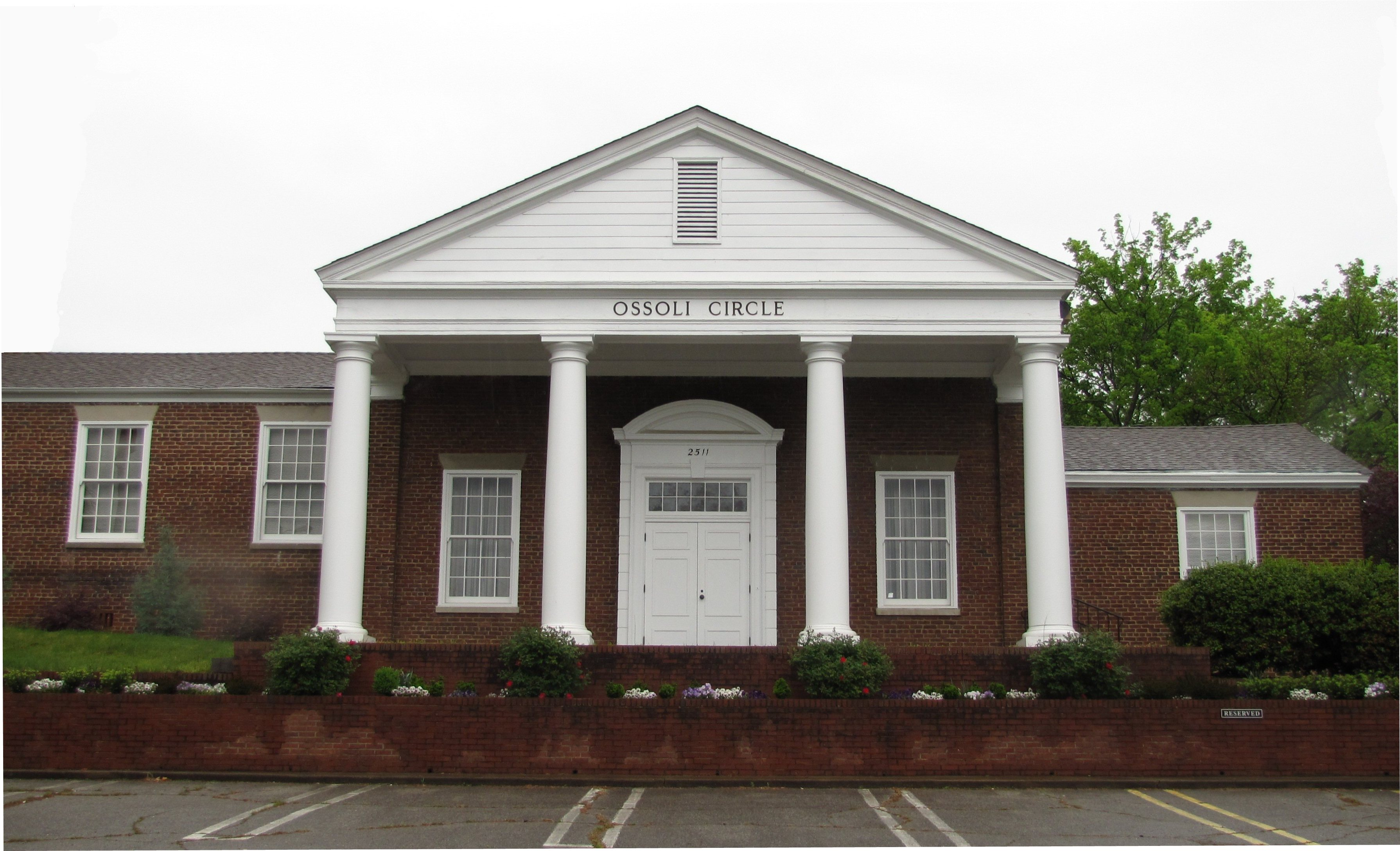
- Location: 2511 Cumberland Avenue
- Nearest city: Knoxville, Tennessee
- Built: 1933
- Architect: Charles I. Barber
- Architectural style: Colonial Revival
- NRHP reference No.: 85000620
- Added to NRHP: March 21, 1985
- Website: GFWCOssoliCircle.org/

The Ossoli Circle is a women's club located in Knoxville, Tennessee, United States. Founded in 1885 as a literary society, the club is a charter member of the General Federation of Women's Clubs, and the first federated women's club in the South. Ossoli has long played an active role in obtaining economic and educational opportunities for women in Tennessee, and its members campaigned for the passage of the Nineteenth Amendment (giving women the right to vote) in the early 1900s. The club currently sponsors over two dozen projects and organizations.

== History ==
The Ossoli Circle was founded by women's rights activist Lizzie Crozier French (1851–1926), who had been inspired by a visit to New York's Sorosis Women's Club, a literary and book club organized in 1868. The first meeting was held at the East Tennessee Female Institute on November 20, 1885, with 12 of the 25 women invited by Crozier-French responding to the invitation. At the suggestion of its first president, Mary Boyce Temple (1856–1929), the club was named in honor of feminist Margaret Fuller Ossoli. Initially a literary society, Ossoli set as its goal the intellectual and moral development of its members.

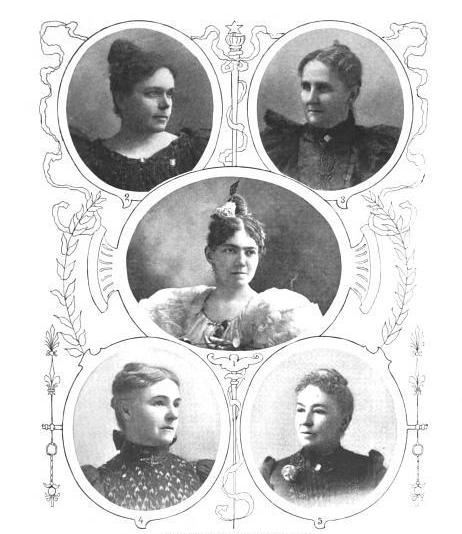
Early presidents of the Ossoli Circle

Early Ossoli members included Knoxville's most educated women. Lizzie Crozier French was director of the East Tennessee Female Institute, and had been educated at the Convent of the Visitation in Washington, D.C. Mary Boyce Temple was a graduate of Vassar College, and Angie Warren Perkins (1858–1921) had been a professor at Wellesley College. Mary Faith Floyd McAdoo (1832–1913) was a noted regional author, and Annie Booth McKinney (1855–1926) was a frequent contributor to magazines such as Harper's Bazaar, Munsey's Magazine, and Vogue.

In 1889, Lizzie Crozier French represented Ossoli a meeting at the Sorosis Club for the purpose of organizing the General Federation of Women's Clubs. The following year, Ossoli members Mary Boyce Temple and Annie Booth McKinney attended the Federation's ratification convention. Temple was chosen as the Federation's first corresponding secretary. In 1896, at Ossoli's urging, the Tennessee Federation of Women's Clubs was established. By this time, Ossoli's membership had grown to 75 members.

In the early 1890s, Ossoli turned its attention toward providing education opportunities for girls and studied the possibilities of coeducation at the state's universities. The University of Tennessee began admitting women in 1892, in part due to Crozier-French's efforts, and Ossoli president Angie Warren Perkins served as U.T.'s first Dean of Women. In the early 1900s, Ossoli funded traveling libraries for the region, and provided assistance to rural schools. The Circle was also instrumental in the formation of a state vocational school for girls.

In 1960, the Circle marked its diamond anniversary with the publication of a 268-page "History of Ossoli Circle," compiled by Mrs. E.L. Bowman. To mark the Circle's centennial in 1985, a 25-year time capsule was dedicated. This time capsule was opened at the Circle's 125th anniversary celebration in 2010.

== Service ==
The Ossoli Circle currently supports over two dozen organizations and projects. Organizations supported by Ossoli include St. Jude's Children's Research Hospital, UNICEF, the East Tennessee Historical Society, the Suffragist Coalition, Childhelp, the Knox Area Rescue Ministry, and the Young-Williams Animal Shelter.

== Ossoli Circle Clubhouse ==
During its early years, the Ossoli Circle met at the East Tennessee Female Institute's Mosaic Hall, at the corner of Henley and Main in downtown Knoxville. Following the Tennessee Centennial Exposition in 1897, several Ossoli members had Knoxville's exhibition building moved from Nashville to Knoxville, where it was rechristened the "Woman's Building." Ossoli met here until it burned in 1906. The Circle met at the Lyceum Building at the corner of Walnut and Cumberland from 1917 until it was torn down in the early 1930s to make way for the Knoxville Post Office.

The current Ossoli Circle Clubhouse on Kingston Pike (formerly Cumberland Avenue) was built in 1933 and designed in the Colonial Revival style by noted Knoxville architect Charles I. Barber of the firm, Barber & McMurry. The facade of the building features a pedimented portico supported by Doric columns. The interior includes a vestibule which opens into a lobby, a hallway entrance flanked by Ionic pilasters, an auditorium with a capacity of approximately 200, as well as a library, dining room, and classrooms.

The Ossoli Circle Clubhouse was listed on the National Register of Historic Places in 1985, in time for the Circle's centennial anniversary.
