= Hugh Lawson White =

American judge and politician (1773–1840)

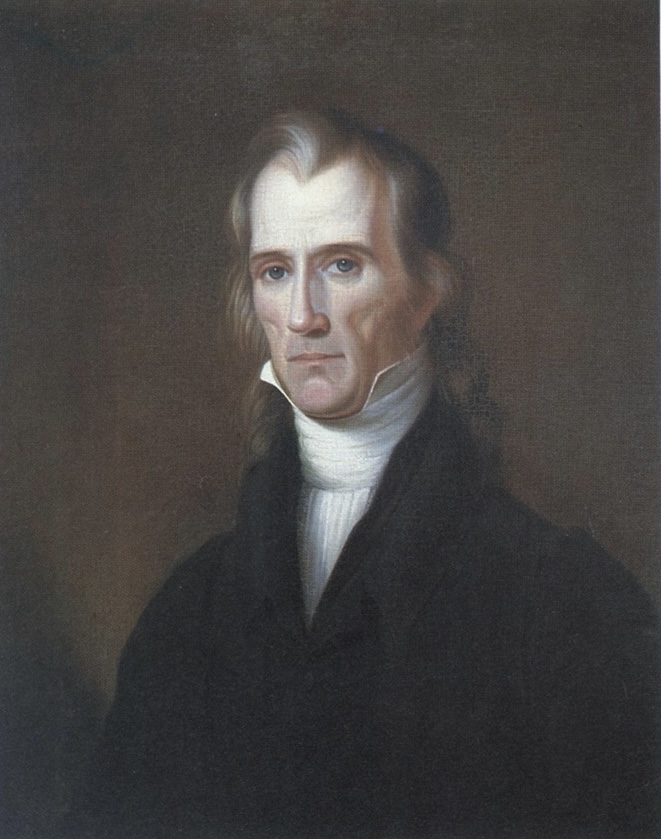
- Hugh Lawson White by Ralph E. W. Earl c. 1830

President pro tempore of the United States Senate
- In office December 3, 1832 – December 15, 1833
- Preceded by: Littleton Tazewell
- Succeeded by: George Poindexter

United States Senator from Tennessee
- In office October 28, 1825 – January 13, 1840
- Preceded by: Andrew Jackson
- Succeeded by: Alexander O. Anderson

Personal details
- Born: Hugh Lawson White; October 30, 1773 Rowan County, North Carolina, British America (later Iredell County)
- Died: April 10, 1840 (aged 66) Knoxville, Tennessee, U.S.
- Resting place: First Presbyterian Church Cemetery
- Party: Democratic-Republican (Before 1825); Democratic (1825–1836); Whig (1836–1840)
- Spouse(s): Elizabeth Carrick (1798–1831); Anne Peyton (1832–1840)
- Children: 12
- Parents: James White; Mary Lawson

Hugh Lawson White (October 30, 1773 – April 10, 1840) was an American politician and judge. After filling in several posts particularly in Tennessee's judiciary and state legislature since 1801, thereunder as a Tennessee Supreme Court justice, he was chosen to succeed Andrew Jackson in the United States Senate in 1825. He became a member of the new Democratic Party, supporting Jackson's policies and his future presidential administration. However, he left the Democrats in 1836 and was a Whig candidate in that year's presidential election.

An ardent strict constructionist and lifelong states' rights advocate, White was one of President Jackson's most trusted allies in Congress in the late 1820s and early 1830s. White fought against the national bank, tariffs, and the use of federal funds for internal improvements, and led efforts in the Senate to pass the Indian Removal Act of 1830. In 1833, at the height of the Nullification Crisis, White, as the Senate's president pro tempore, coordinated negotiations over the Tariff of 1833.

Suspicious of the growing power of the presidency, White began to distance himself from Jackson in the mid-1830s, and realigned himself with Henry Clay and the burgeoning Whig Party. He was eventually forced out of the Senate when Jackson's allies, led by James K. Polk, gained control of the Tennessee state legislature and demanded his resignation.

== Biography ==
=== Early life ===
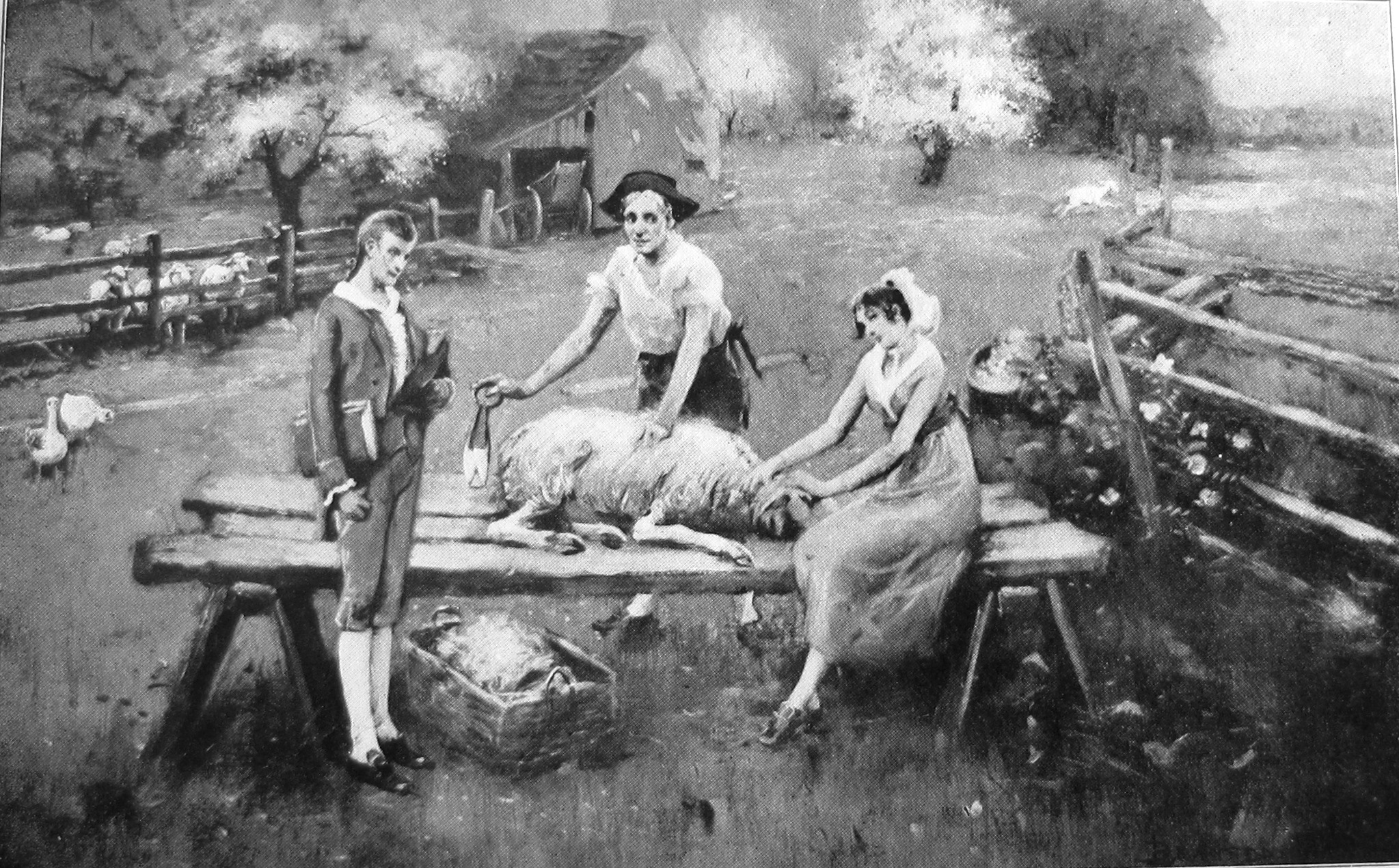
Lloyd Branson's "Sheep-shearing scene," showing Hugh Lawson White (left), his future father-in-law Samuel Carrick (middle), and future wife, Elizabeth

Hugh Lawson White was born in what became Iredell County, North Carolina (at the time part of Rowan County), the eldest son of James White and Mary Lawson White. James, a Revolutionary War veteran, moved his family to the Tennessee frontier in the 1780s, and played an active role in the failed State of Franklin. In 1786, he constructed White's Fort, which eventually developed into Knoxville, Tennessee. Young Hugh was a sentinel at the fort and helped manage its small gristmill.

In 1791, White's Fort was chosen as the capital of the newly created Southwest Territory, and James White's friend, William Blount, was appointed governor of the territory. Hugh Lawson White worked as Blount's personal secretary, and was tutored by early Knoxville minister and educator, Samuel Carrick. In 1793, he fought in the territorial militia under John Sevier during the Cherokee–American wars. Historian J. G. M. Ramsey credited Hugh Lawson White's company with the killing of the Chickamauga Cherokee war chief, King Fisher, and White's granddaughter and biographer, Nancy Scott, stated that White fired the fatal shot.

White studied law in Lancaster, Pennsylvania, under James Hopkins, and was admitted to the bar in 1796. Two years later, he married Elizabeth Carrick, the daughter of his mentor, Samuel.

=== The judiciary and early political career ===
In 1801, White was appointed judge of the Superior Court of Tennessee, then the state's highest court. In 1807, he resigned after being elected to the state legislature. He left the state legislature in 1809, following his appointment to the state's Court of Errors and Appeals (which replaced the Superior Court as the highest court). He resigned this position in 1815 when he was elected to the state senate. He served in the state senate until 1817. As a state legislator, White helped reform the state's land laws, and engineered the passage of an anti-dueling measure.

In 1812, White was named president of the Knoxville branch of the Bank of Tennessee. White was described as a very cautious banker, and his bank was one of the few in the state to survive the Panic of 1819.

In 1821, President James Monroe appointed White to a commission to settle claims against Spain, following the Adams-Onís Treaty in which that nation sold Florida to the United States.

=== United States Senate ===
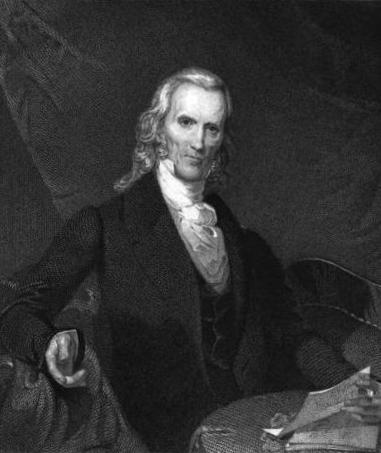
Portrait of White by Emanuel Leutze

In 1825, the Tennessee state legislature chose White to replace Andrew Jackson in the United States Senate (Jackson had resigned following his failed run for the presidency in 1824). White spearheaded the Southern states' opposition to sending delegates to 1826 Congress of Panama, which was a general gathering of various nations in the Western Hemisphere, many of which had declared their independence from Spain and abolished slavery. White argued that if the U.S. attended the congress, it would violate the commitment to neutrality put forth by President Washington decades earlier, and stated that the nation should not get involved in foreign treaties merely for the sake of "gratifying national vanity."

Following Jackson's election to the presidency in 1828, White became one of the Jackson Administration's key congressional allies. White was chairman of the Senate Committee on Indian Affairs, which drew up the Indian Removal Act of 1830, a major initiative of Jackson. The act called for the relocation of the remaining Native American tribes in the southeastern United States to territories west of the Mississippi River and would culminate in the so-called Trail of Tears.

In an 1836 speech, White described himself as a "strict constructionist," arguing that the federal government could not pass any laws outside its powers specifically stated in the Constitution. Like many Jacksonians, he was a staunch states' rights advocate. He opposed the national bank, and rejected federal funding for internal improvements (which he believed only the states had the power to fund). He also supported Jackson's call for the elimination of the Electoral College. A slaveowner himself, he opposed federal intervention into the issue of slavery.

Like most Southern senators, White opposed the Tariff of 1828, which placed a high tax on goods imported from overseas to protect growing northern industries. White argued that while the federal government had the power to impose tariffs, it should only do so when it benefited the nation as a whole, and not merely one section (i.e., the North) at the expense of another (i.e., the agrarian South, which relied on trade with England). During the resulting Nullification Crisis in late 1832 and early 1833, as the Senate's president pro tempore (presiding officer of the Senate in the absence of the Vice President), White coordinated negotiations in the interim between the resignation of Vice President John C. Calhoun (December 28, 1832) and the swearing in of Vice President Martin Van Buren (March 4, 1833). Vice President Calhoun's resignation put White next in line to assume the presidency.

=== 1836 presidential election ===
Toward the end of Jackson's first term, a rift developed between White and Jackson. In 1831, as Jackson reshuffled his cabinet in the aftermath of the Petticoat affair, White was offered the office of Secretary of War but turned it down. During the Nullification Crisis in February 1833, White angered Jackson by appointing Delaware senator and Clay ally John M. Clayton to the select committee to consider the Clay compromise. In later speeches, White stated that the Jackson Administration had drifted away from the party's core states' rights principles, and argued that the executive was gaining too much power.

At the end of Jackson's second term, the Tennessee state legislature endorsed White for the presidency in 1835. This angered Jackson, as he had chosen Martin Van Buren as his successor. White stated that no sitting president should choose a successor, arguing that doing so was akin to having a monarchy. In 1836, White left Jackson's party entirely, and decided to run for president as a candidate for the Whig Party led by Henry Clay, which had mainly formed from opposition to Jackson but also continued the nationalist agenda of the National Republican Party, although this very contradicting position in regard to White's ideals was not yet determined at that time, as the party was still regionally factionalized.

In the 1836 presidential election, the Whig Party, unable to agree on a candidate, ran four candidates against Van Buren: White, William Henry Harrison, Daniel Webster, and Willie Person Mangum. Jackson actively campaigned against White in Tennessee, and accused him of being a federalist who was opposed to states' rights. In spite of this, White won Tennessee, as well as Georgia, giving him 26 electoral votes, the third highest total behind Van Buren's 170 and Harrison's 73.

=== Later career ===
By 1837, the relationship between White and Jackson had turned hostile. Jackson was outraged when he learned that White had accused his administration of committing outright fraud, and stated in a letter to Adam Huntsman that White had a "lax code of morals." Jackson's allies such as James K. Polk, Felix Grundy, and John Catron, also turned against White and blamed him for the dispute with Jackson. White stood by his accusations and blasted Jackson for making "useless expenditures" of public money, and increasing the power of the presidency.

By the late 1830s, Jackson's allies had gained control of the Tennessee state legislature. After White refused their demand that he vote for the Subtreasury Bill, he was forced to resign on January 13, 1840. Following a large banquet in Washington, White returned to his native Knoxville. His entry into the city was marked by the firing of cannons and the ringing of church bells, as he paraded through the streets on horseback.

Shortly after his return, White fell ill, and he died on April 10, 1840. A large funeral procession led his casket and riderless horse through the streets of Knoxville. He is interred with his family in the First Presbyterian Church Cemetery.

== Personality and style ==
White believed strongly in the principles of strict constructionism and a limited federal government and voted against fellow Jacksonians if he felt their initiatives ran counter to these principles. His independent nature and his stern rectitude earned him the appellation "The Cato of the United States." His congressional colleague, Henry Wise, later wrote that White's "patriotism and firmness" as the Senate's president pro tempore was key to resolving the Nullification Crisis.

White believed that being on the public payroll obligated him to attend every Senate meeting, no matter the issue. Felix Grundy recalled that White once departed Knoxville in the middle of a driving snowstorm to ensure he made it to Washington in time for the Senate's fall session. Senator John Milton Niles later wrote that White was often "the only listener to a dull speech." White prided himself on being the most punctual member of the Senate and was usually the first senator to arrive at the Capitol on days when the Senate was in session. Senator Ephraim H. Foster once told a story about waking up well before sunrise one morning, determined to beat White to the Capitol at least once in his career, and arriving only to find White in the committee room analyzing some papers.

== Family and legacy ==
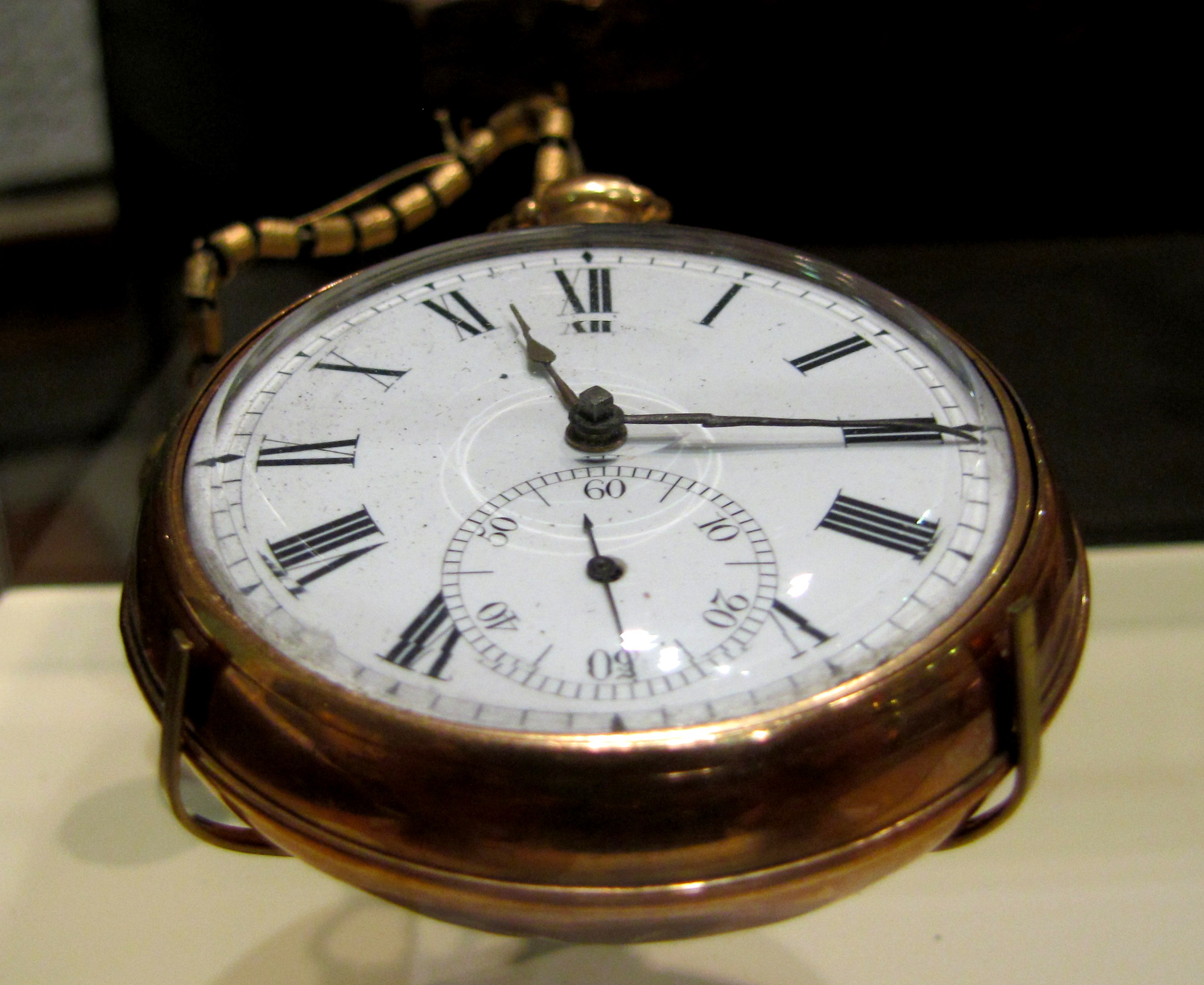
White's pocket watch on display at the Center for East Tennessee History

White's father, James White (1747–1820), was the founder of Knoxville, Tennessee. His brothers-in-law included surveyor Charles McClung (1761–1835), who platted Knoxville in 1791, Judge John Overton (1766–1833), the co-founder of Memphis, Tennessee, and Senator John Williams (1778–1837). White and his first wife, Elizabeth Carrick, had 12 children, two of whom died in infancy. Between 1825 and 1831, eight of their surviving ten children died of tuberculosis. Their lone surviving son, Samuel (1825–1860), served as mayor of Knoxville in 1857.

White's farm lay just west of Second Creek in Knoxville. In the late 19th century, this became a land development area known as "White's Addition." The area is now part of the University of Tennessee campus and the Fort Sanders neighborhood. White County, Arkansas was named in his honor.

U.S. Senate
Preceded by Andrew Jackson	U.S. Senator (Class 2) from Tennessee; 1825–1840; Served alongside: John Eaton, Felix Grundy, Ephraim H. Foster, Felix Grundy	Succeeded by Alexander O. Anderson
Preceded by Thomas Benton	Chair of the Senate Indian Affairs Committee; 1828–1832	Succeeded by George Troup
Preceded by George Troup	Chair of the Senate Indian Affairs Committee; 1833–1840	Succeeded by Ambrose Sevier
Political offices
Preceded by Littleton Tazewell	President pro tempore of the United States Senate; 1832–1833	Succeeded by George Poindexter
Party political offices
New political party	Whig nominee for President of the United States; 1836^{(1)}	Succeeded by William Henry Harrison
Preceded by John Floyd	Nullifier nominee for President of the United States; Endorsed; 1836	Party dissolved
Notes and references
1. The Whig Party ran regional candidates in 1836. White ran in the Southern states, William Henry Harrison ran in the Northern states, and Daniel Webster ran in Massachusetts.
