= First Presbyterian Church Cemetery =

Historic cemetery in Tennessee, United States

- U.S. National Register of Historic Places
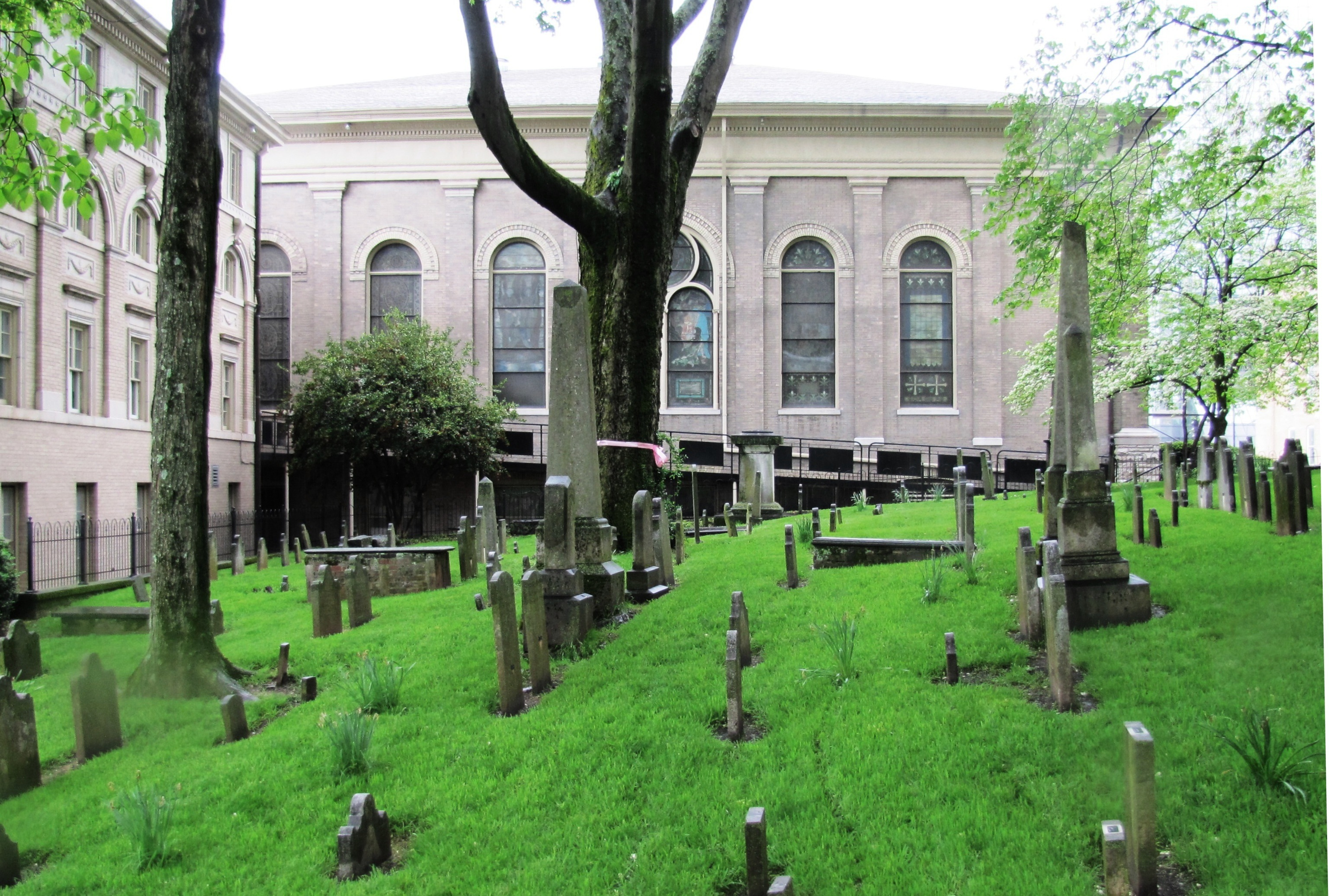
- First Presbyterian Church Cemetery in 2010, with the church in the background
- Location: Adjacent to 620 State St. Knoxville, Tennessee
- Coordinates: 35.9643°N 83.9161°W
- MPS: Knoxville and Knox County MPS
- NRHP reference No.: 96001400
- Added to NRHP: December 4, 1996

The First Presbyterian Church Graveyard is the oldest graveyard in Knoxville, Tennessee, United States. Established in the 1790s, the graveyard contains the graves of some of Knoxville's most prominent early residents, including territorial governor and Constitutional Convention delegate William Blount and Knoxville founder James White. In 1996, the graveyard was added to the National Register of Historic Places.

While platting Knoxville with his son-in-law, Charles McClung, in 1791, White ordered at least one lot to be set aside for a church and cemetery. The cemetery spot may have been used as early as the 1780s for burials, and the cemetery contained several graves by 1799, but the earliest marker is Blount's, dated 1800. While the First Presbyterian congregation was active in the 1790s, the first church was not built on the site until 1816. The graveyard was used for burials for nearly sixty years, its most active period being during the Epidemic of 1838, in which hundreds of Knoxvillians died from an unidentified illness.

== History ==
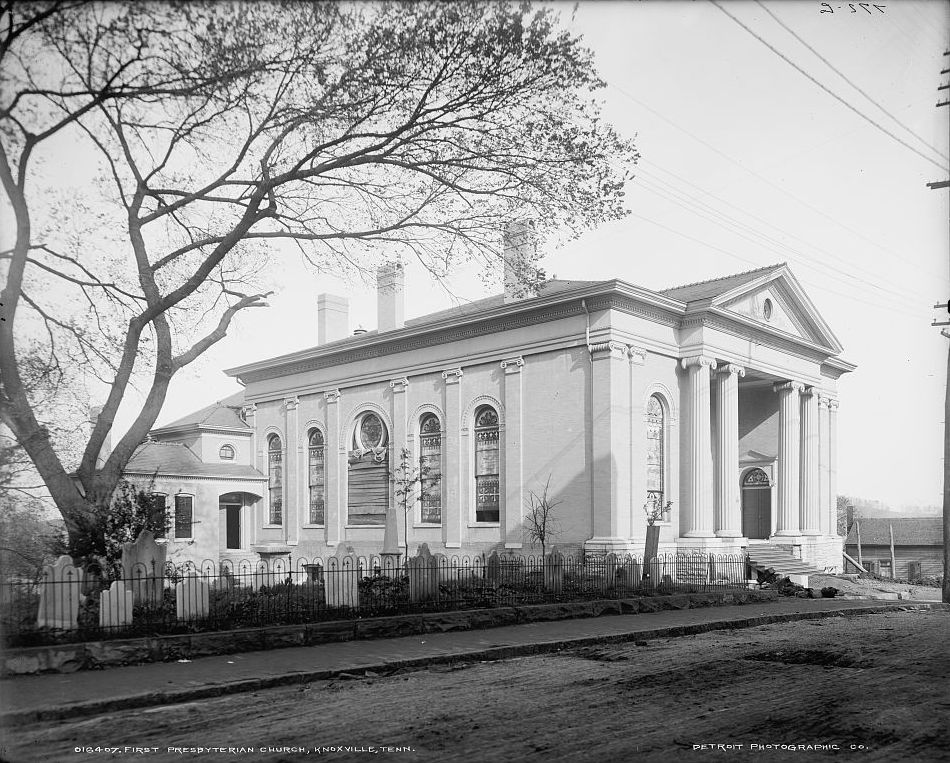
First Presbyterian Church, c. 1906

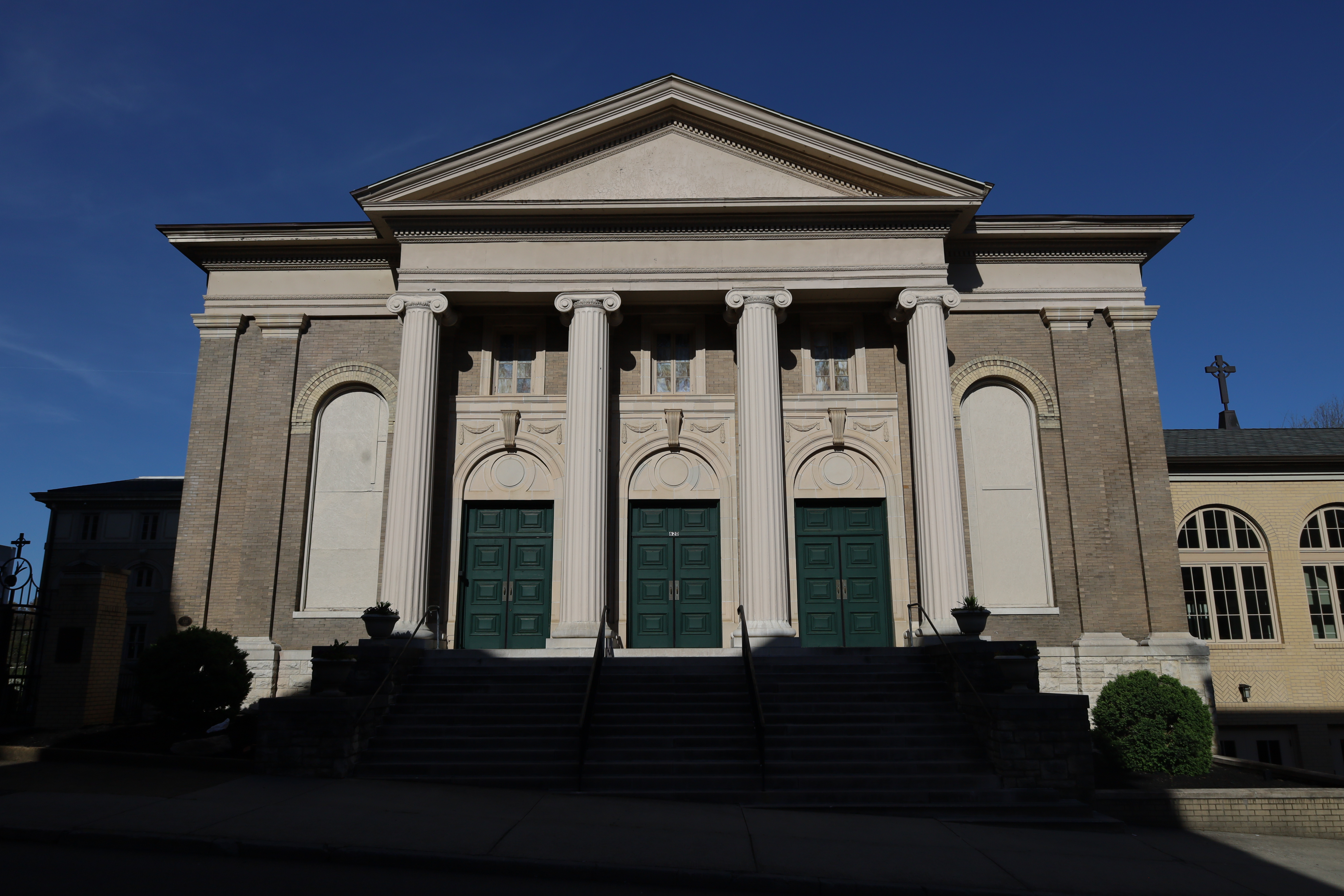
The church building in 2025

In 1790, after his fort was chosen as the capital for the newly created Southwest Territory, James White asked his son-in-law, surveyor Charles McClung, to lay out a new town, named "Knoxville" after Secretary of War Henry Knox. McClung initially divided the town into 64 half-acre (0.2-ha) lots, and added additional lots in 1795, with the cemetery lot being included in the later additions. While the cemetery was not officially platted until 1795, historians speculate that burials likely occurred before that date. When Moravian missionary Frederick de Schweinitz passed through Knoxville in 1799, he reported that the cemetery already had numerous burials.

The First Presbyterian congregation was organized by the Reverend Samuel Carrick in the 1790s, and the first church was erected adjacent to the cemetery in 1816. Shortly after the church's completion, disputes arose over several matters, including the renting of pews, and a doctrinal dispute between "Old Calvinists" and "Hopkinsians". A portion of the congregation split from First Presbyterian, and founded Second Presbyterian Church circa 1818.

In 1838, hundreds Knoxvillians died when an unknown illness (possibly malaria) swept through the town. Approximately one-tenth of the marked graves in the graveyard are dated "1838"— more than any other single year— and one tombstone mentions "the fever." The graveyard was open to new burials until 1857, but the last burial took place in 1879. During the Civil War, Confederate soldiers (who occupied the town 1861–1863) kept horses in the cemetery, and Union soldiers (who occupied the town 1863–1865) used the church as a hospital and barracks.

Humorist George Washington Harris (1814–1869), an ardent Presbyterian, served as an elder of the First Presbyterian Church during his years in Knoxville. Two of his children, Harriet (1838–1846) and George (1841–1842), are buried in the graveyard.

In the 1870s, the graveyard had an indirect effect on the career of future newspaper publisher, Adolph Ochs. Ochs, then a young teenager working after hours as a "printer's devil" for the Knoxville Chronicle, feared walking past the graveyard at night, as many locals believed it to be haunted. Rather than leave work after his shift (which ended close to midnight), Ochs stayed until daylight, spending the extra time learning the typesetting and printing trades.

The present First Presbyterian Church, constructed in 1903, is a Neoclassical building, with a Tiffany-style stained glass window.

== Layout and marker styles ==
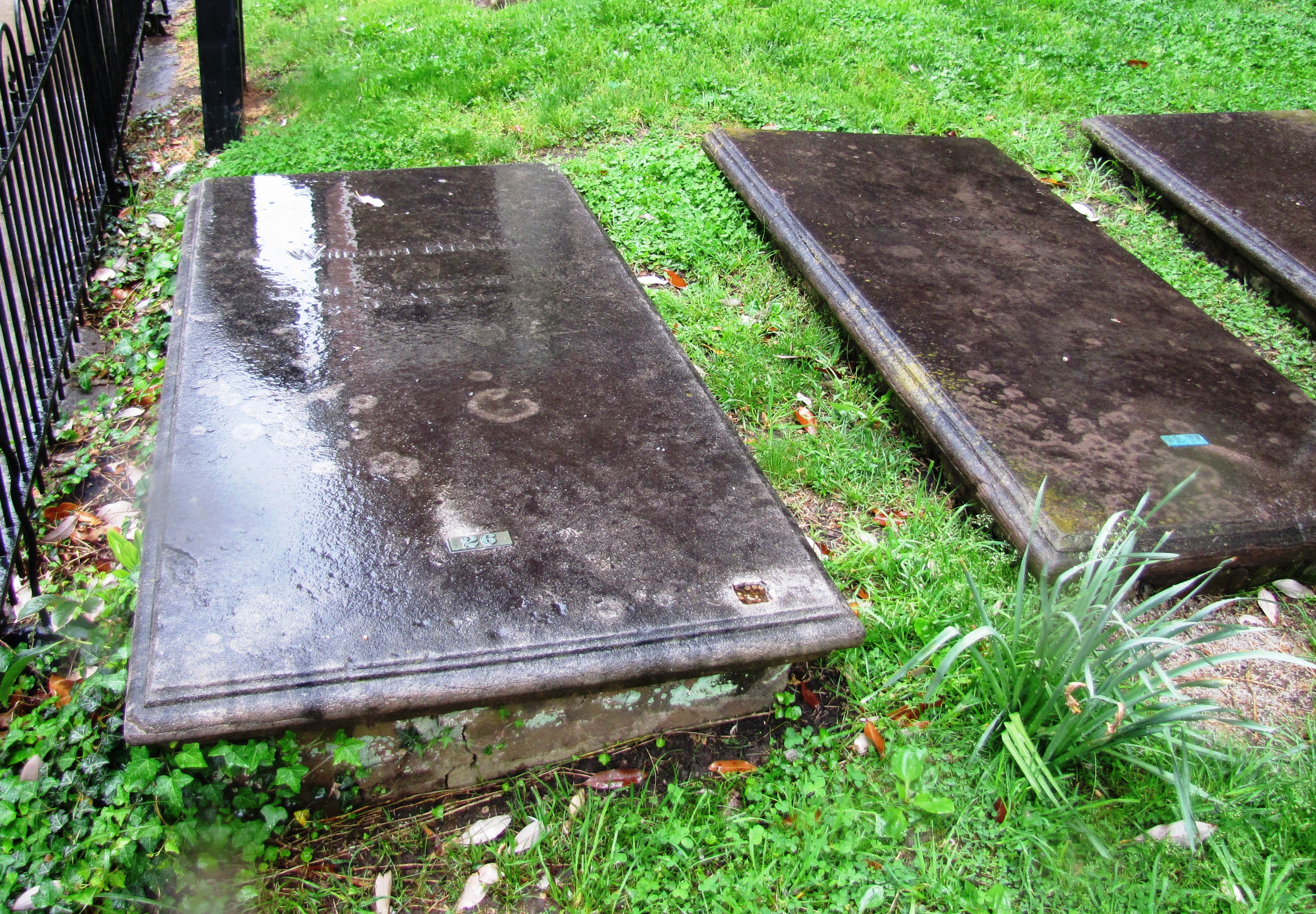
Graves of William Blount (left) and his wife, Mary Grainger Blount

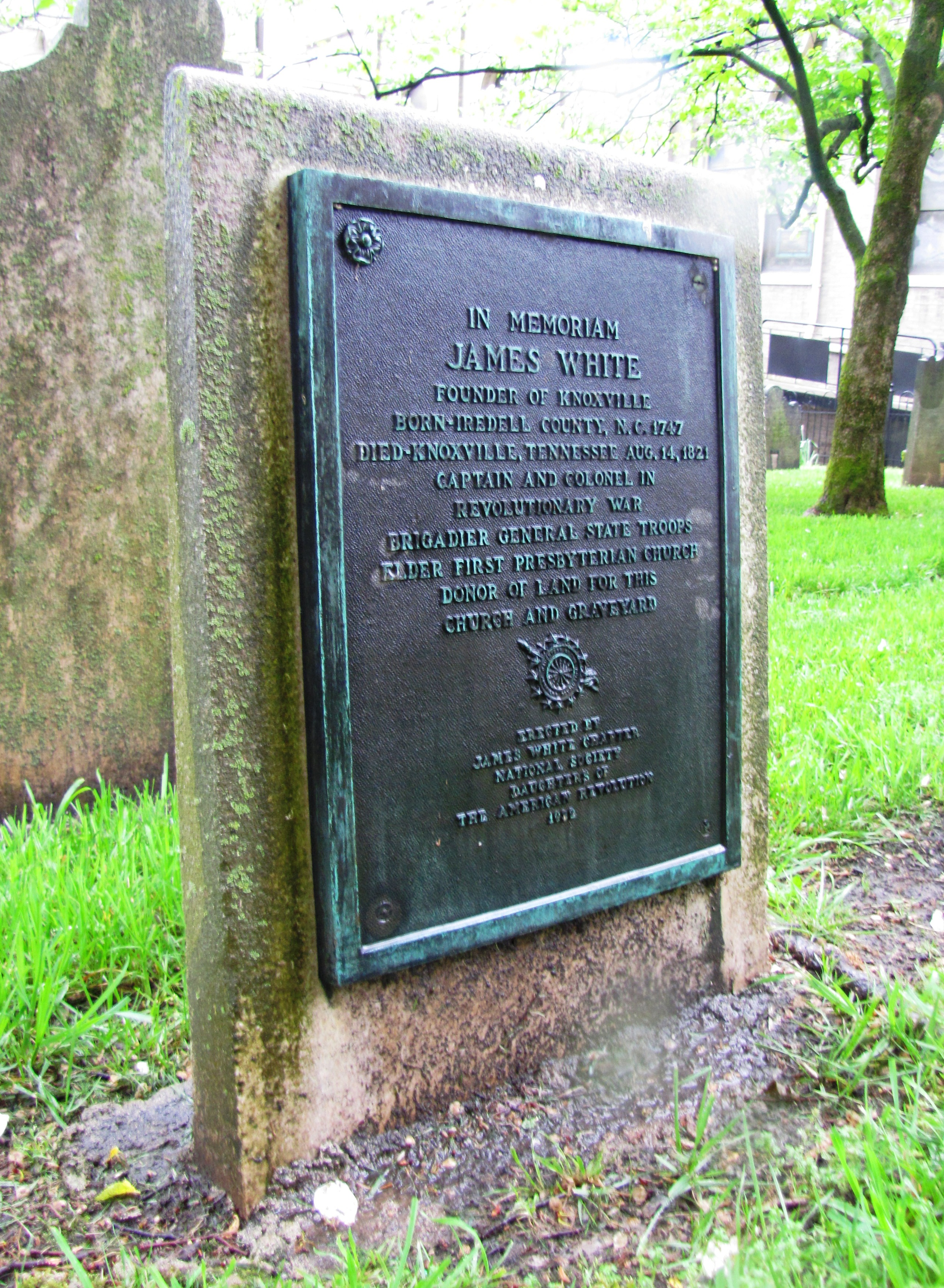
Marker of Knoxville's founder, James White

The First Presbyterian Church Graveyard resembles a traditional early Anglo-American cemetery, with graves crowded together and marked by relatively simple headstones. Most of the headstones are polished, upright stones, although a few (such as the Blounts') are flat stones. Most are adorned with simple inscriptions noting the deceased's name, date of death, and number of years lived. A low iron fence surrounds the graveyard's perimeter, and crude stone walkways allow access.

== Notable interments ==
- Abner Baker (1843–1865), a Confederate veteran lynched for killing a Union veteran at the Knox County Courthouse in September 1865.
- William Blount (1749–1800), Governor of the Southwest Territory (1790–1796), U.S. senator from Tennessee (1796–1797), signer of the U.S. Constitution. His wife, Mary Grainger Blount (c. 1761–1802), is buried next to him.
- Samuel Carrick (1760–1809), the church's founder; first president of Blount College (now the University of Tennessee), 1794–1809.
- John Craighead (1783–1826), church elder and early Knoxville alderman, builder of the Craighead-Jackson House.
- Thomas Humes (1767–1816), church elder and early Knoxville businessman, builder of the Lamar House Hotel building (now houses the Bijou Theatre).
- Hugh Lawson White (1773–1840), U.S. senator (1825–1840), presidential candidate in 1836 (Whig Party). Buried adjacent to his father, James White.
- James White (1747–1821), Knoxville's founder. The Daughters of the American Revolution placed a bronze plaque on his headstone in 1932.
- John Williams (1778–1837), U.S. senator (1815–1823).

== See also ==
- List of cemeteries in Tennessee
- Knoxville National Cemetery
- Old Gray Cemetery
