= Samuel Carrick =

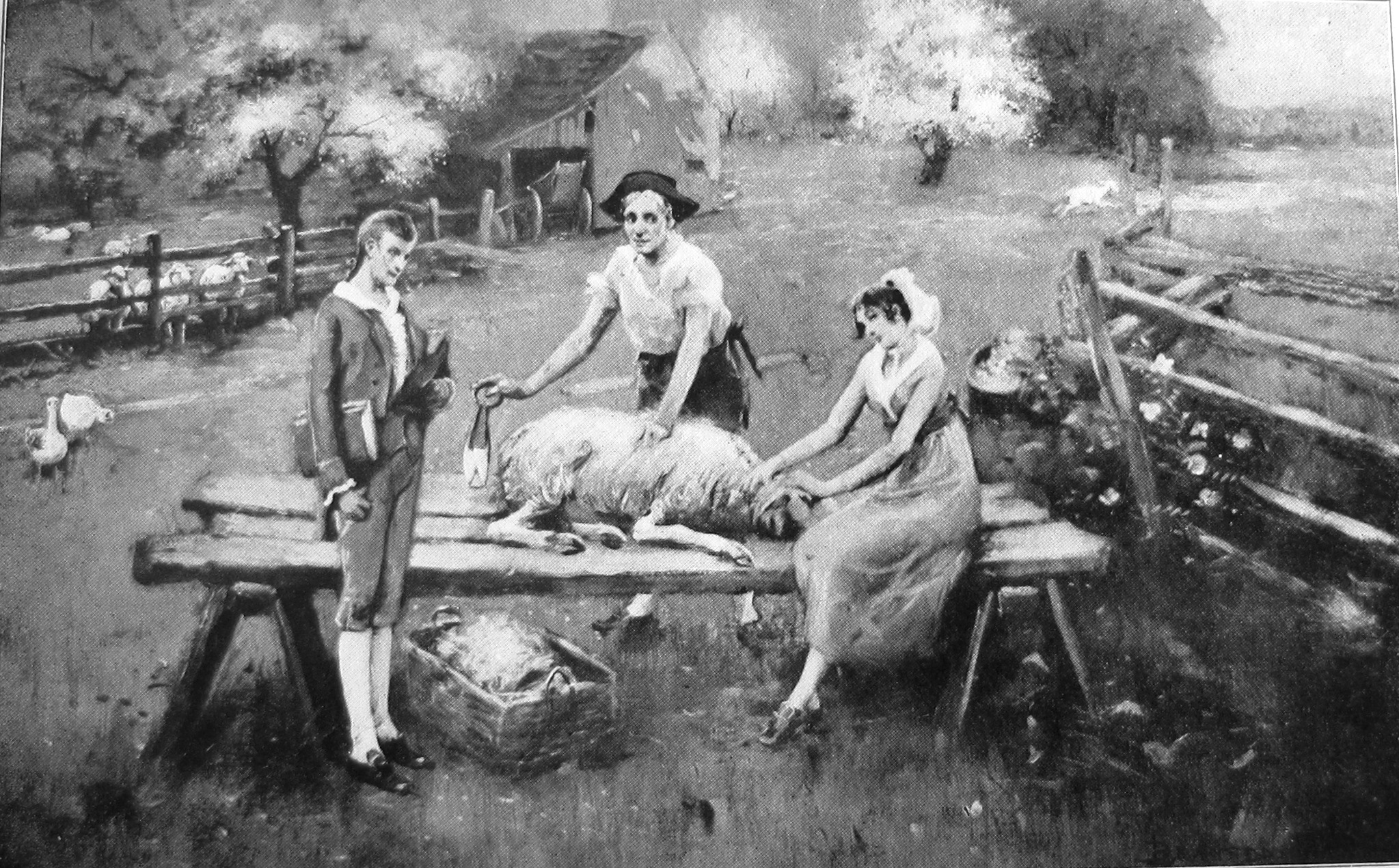
- Painting by Lloyd Branson showing Carrick (middle) shearing a sheep while meeting with his future son-in-law, Hugh Lawson White, and daughter, Elizabeth

President of Blount College (now the University of Tennessee)
- In office 1794–1809

Personal details
- Born: July 17, 1760 Pennsylvania, U.S.
- Died: August 17, 1809 (aged 49)
- Spouse: Elizabeth Moore

Samuel Czar Carrick (July 17, 1760 – August 17, 1809) was an American Presbyterian minister who was the first president of Blount College, the educational institution to which the University of Tennessee traces its origin.

== Early life ==
Carrick was born on July 17, 1760, in Pennsylvania. He received his education in Virginia, and was ordained as a minister when he was 22 years old.

== Career ==
In 1790, Carrick helped establish the Lebanon-in-the-Fork Presbyterian Church at the confluence of the Holston and French Broad Rivers. On October 3, 1791, Carrick took part in the initial drawing of lots for Knoxville, which had been platted as a capital for the Southwest Territory. He and his family moved to the new city shortly afterward.

In December 1792, Carrick began advertising a "seminary" that operated out of his home, where he offered a classical education. During the same period, he established the First Presbyterian Church on a State Street lot set aside by Knoxville founder James White, although no building was constructed for the church until after Carrick's death. On January 12, 1796, Carrick delivered the opening prayer and sermon for the Tennessee Constitutional Convention.

In 1794, Carrick expanded his educational efforts when the territorial legislature chartered Blount College, named for territorial governor William Blount. The school initially met in a building on the lot now bounded by Gay Street, State Street, Church Avenue, and Clinch Avenue, which had been donated by James White. Carrick was the college's president and only faculty member. The tuition fee was $8.00 per semester. The school was rechartered as East Tennessee College in 1807 or 1808 and closed after Carrick's death in August 1809. Only one student ever graduated from Blount College.

== Personal life, death and legacy ==
Carrick married Elizabeth Moore in Rockbridge County, Virginia, in 1779.

Carrick died on August 17, 1809. He was buried in First Presbyterian Church Cemetery in Knoxville. East Tennessee College reopened in 1820, 11 years after Carrick's death, under the leadership of David A. Sherman.
