= Lebanon in the Forks Cemetery =

Historic cemetery in Tennessee, United States

- U.S. National Register of Historic Places
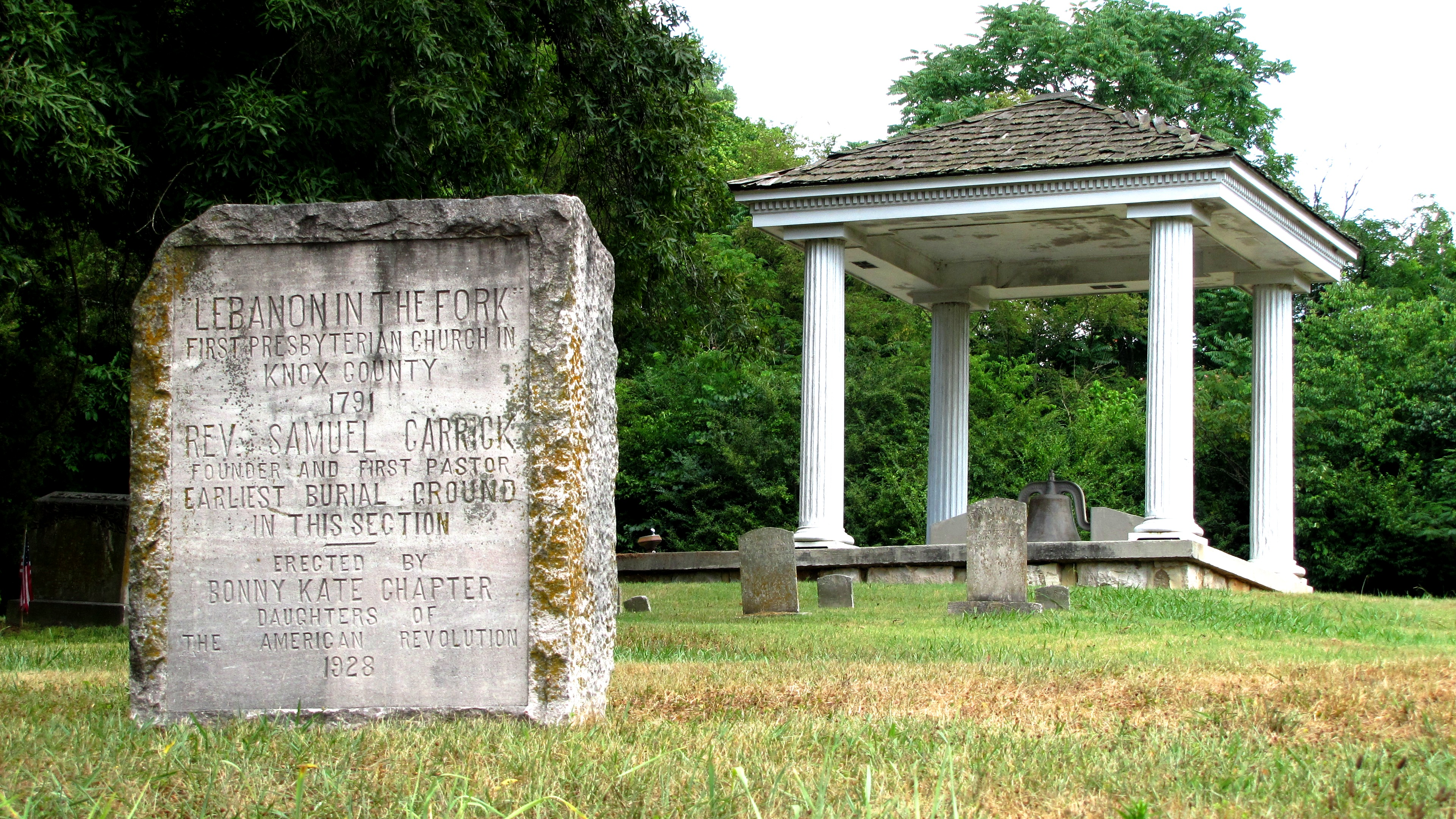
- The Lebanon in the Forks Cemetery in 2010

- Location within Tennessee Location within the United States
- Location: Knoxville, Tennessee
- Coordinates: 35°57′38″N 83°50′49″W
- NRHP reference No.: 10000934
- Added to NRHP: November 29, 2010

The Lebanon in the Fork Cemetery, also known as Three Rivers Cemetery, is a historic cemetery located at 2390 Asbury Road in eastern Knoxville, Tennessee, U.S..

== History ==
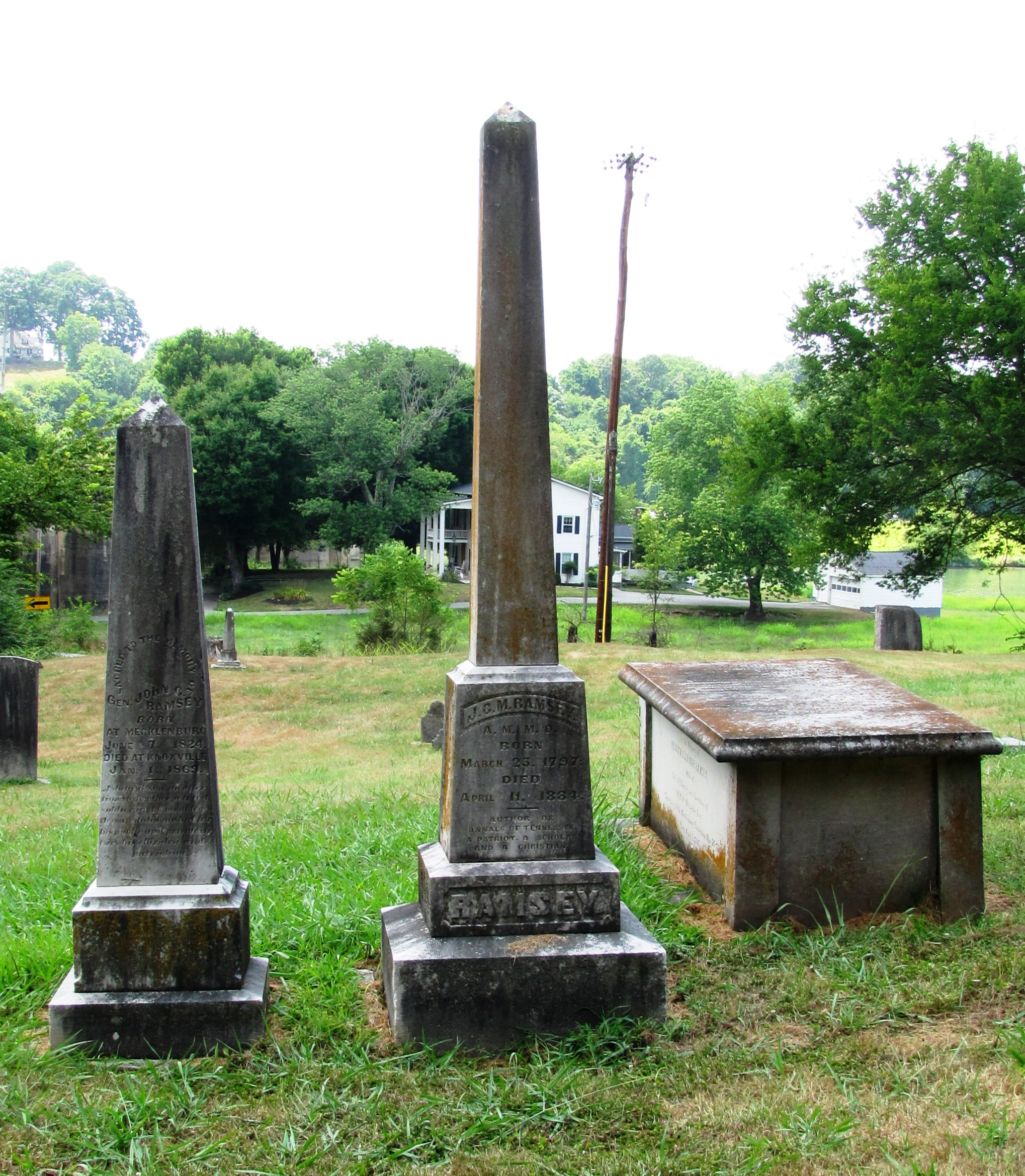
Grave of Reverend J. G. M. Ramsey.

The Lebanon In The Fork Presbyterian Church was founded during 1791 by the Rev. Samuel Carrick.

Francis Alexander Ramsey, father of J. G. M. Ramsey, later donated nine acres of land overlooking the wide confluence of the Holston River with the French Broad River, where the "fork" and beginning of the Tennessee River is formed.

The first Lebanon In The Fork Presbyterian Church (no longer extant) at this site provided by Ramsey was constructed near the crest of the hill of rough hewn logs and measured approximately 40 feet by sixty feet. This earlier structure was eventually replaced by a newer and larger building built in 1903. It served the church until it was burnt down by a fire in 1981. The bell was recovered and now sits in the cemetery. The church cemetery has been listed on the National Register of Historic Places since November 29, 2010.

The Lebanon in the Fork Presbyterian Church pastors included Samuel Carrick, Isaac L. Anderson, J. G. M. Ramsey, and Richard Owen Currey.

According to an account of a visit to Mecklenburg by "Ora," a correspondent of the Mobile Advertiser, (and later republished in within the April 6, 1862 edition of the Knoxville Register), the J.G.M Ramsey's Mecklenburg residence was located about 100 yards from "...the ruins of the old Presbyterian Church of Lebanon".

The nearby historic Ramsey House (also known as "Swan Pond", the residence of Francis Alexander Ramsey and his family) offers guided tours of this residence that was built by Francis Alexander Ramsey. The Ramsey House also maintains the Lebanon In The Fork Presbyterian Church cemetery.
