= J. G. M. Ramsey =

American historian (1797–1884)

Dr. J. G. M. Ramsey
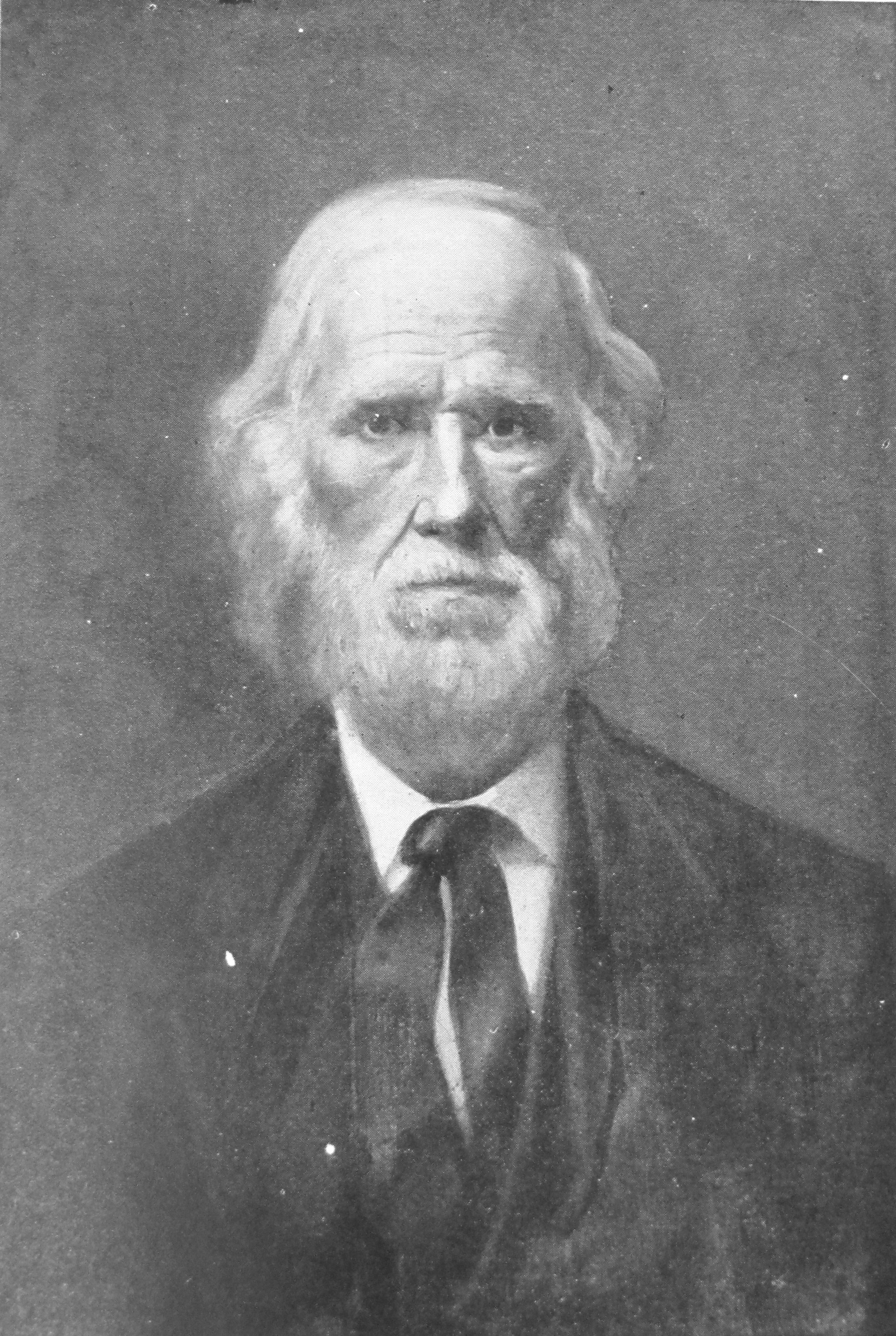
- Portrait of J. G. M. Ramsey by artist Lloyd Branson
- Born: James Gettys McGready Ramsey; March 25, 1797; Knoxville, Tennessee, United States
- Died: April 11, 1884 (aged 87); Knoxville, Tennessee, United States
- Resting place: Lebanon-in-the-Fork Cemetery; 35.96029°N 83.84708°W
- Education: Washington College
- Occupations: Physician, businessman, planter, slave owner, historian
- Notable work: The Annals of Tennessee (1853)
- Political party: Democratic Party
- Spouse: Margaret Crozier
- Children: Elizabeth Ramsey (Breck); John Crozier Ramsey; William Wilberforce Ramsey; Margaret Ramsey (Dickson); Francis Alexander Ramsey; Robert Ramsey; Henrietta Ramsey (Lenoir); J.G. McKnitt Ramsey; Charlotte Ramsey; Arthur Ramsey; Susan Ramsey (Alexander)
- Parent(s): Francis Alexander Ramsey and Peggy Alexander

James Gettys McGready Ramsey (March 25, 1797 – April 11, 1884) was an American historian, medical doctor, planter, slave owner, and businessman, active primarily in East Tennessee during the nineteenth century. Ramsey is perhaps best known for his book, The Annals of Tennessee to the End of the Eighteenth Century, a seminal work documenting the state's frontier and early statehood periods. Ramsey was also a major advocate for development in East Tennessee, leading efforts to bring railroad access to the region, and helping to organize the region's first medical society.

As the son of a prominent Tennessee statesman, Ramsey encountered as a child many of the state's important early political figures, giving him a unique historical perspective on the state's early years. After his father's death, Ramsey began compiling a vast collection of historical documents related to the state's Watauga, Franklin, and Southwest Territory periods. After years of exchanging advice and notes with fellow historian Lyman Draper, Ramsey published the 700-plus page Annals in 1853. While the book has been praised for its attention to accuracy and factual detail, modern historians have criticized it for its lack of historical inquiry and its overemphasis on biography and warfare.

A lifelong states' rights Democrat, Ramsey supported the Confederacy during the Civil War, and as a Confederate treasury agent, he was forced to flee Knoxville under an armed guard ahead of the city's Federal occupation in 1863. While the war left his family and finances in ruins, Ramsey nevertheless returned to Knoxville in the early 1870s, and gradually rebuilt his fortune. His funeral procession in 1884 was the largest ever witnessed in Knoxville until that time.

== Biography ==
=== Early life ===
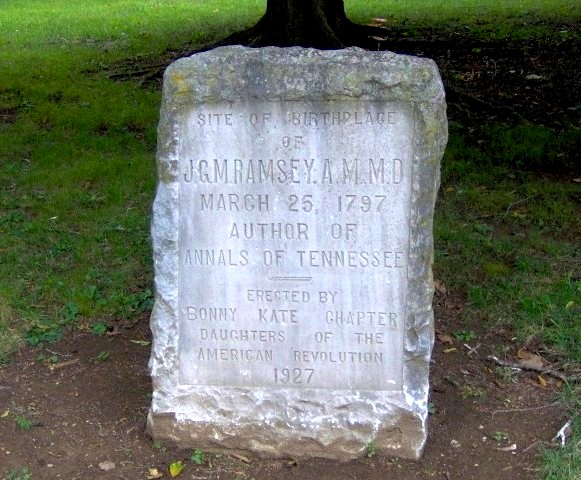
DAR marker at the Ramsey House, recalling the site as J.G.M. Ramsey's birthplace

Ramsey was born in a temporary cabin at what is now the Ramsey House (the house was still under construction) in 1797, the fourth son of Francis Alexander Ramsey and Peggy Alexander, both of Scots-Irish descent.

Francis Alexander had left Pennsylvania possessing only his horse, and both a surveying compass and chain during 1783 at age 19 after having been invited by his material uncle John Alexander to live with him on Big Limestone Creek at what was then Washington County, North Carolina (now Greene County, Tennessee) and within approximately one mile of the Martin Academy founded by the Rev. Samuel Doak.

Also during 1783, Ramsey's father helped James White explore what is now the Knoxville area, and later served in various capacities in the State of Franklin and Southwest Territory governments. Guests who frequented the Ramsey House during Ramsey's formative years included John Sevier and Willie Blount, and Knoxville founders James White and Charles McClung.

Francis Alexander married Margaret "Peggy" Alexander from Mecklenburg, North Carolina on April 7, 1789, and moved his 23 year old bride to his Limestone residence where they lived until 1792 or 1793, when they moved away to Swan Pond. Swan Pond is located within the Lebanon In The Fork area east of Knoxville where the Holston River meets at a confluence with the French Broad River, these rivers together forming the beginning of the Tennessee River.

J.G.M. Ramsey studied with private tutors as a child before attending the Ebenezer Academy, located in what is now West Knoxville. He graduated from Washington College (previously, Martin Academy) during March 1816, and later studied medicine at the University of Pennsylvania. He married Margaret Crozier in 1821, and began practicing medicine in Knoxville.

=== Business interests ===
After his father's death in 1820, Ramsey succeeded him as president of the Knoxville Branch of the Bank of Tennessee. During the same period, he began building a large plantation at the confluence of the French Broad and Holston rivers, named "Mecklenburg" after his mother's native Mecklenburg County, North Carolina. Along with a large mansion, Mecklenburg included a 4,000-volume library that contained many important documents pertaining to Tennessee's early history, as well as a ferry across the Holston River immediately at its confluence with the French Broad River, east of Knoxville.

According to an account of a visit to Mecklenburg by "Ora," a correspondent of the Mobile Advertiser, (and later republished within the April 6, 1862 edition of the Knoxville Register), the Ramsey's Mecklenburg residence was located about 100 yards from "...the ruins of the old Presbyterian Church of Lebanon".

As early as 1825, Ramsey had proposed connecting Knoxville with the Atlantic Coast via railroad, which would have given the region's farmers better access to markets in Charleston. Over the years, Ramsey negotiated several hundred thousand dollars' worth of bonds, which funded the first railroads built in the region. Ramsey also championed improvements to the Tennessee River that would give Knoxville's river merchants year-round access to the Mississippi River. In 1828, the first steamboat to reach Knoxville, the Atlas, docked at Mecklenburg, prompting Ramsey to give a speech on the meaning of patriotism.

During the 1850s, Ramsey served as a director of the East Tennessee and Georgia Railroad, which finally brought railroad access to Knoxville in 1855. In 1858, the Bank of East Tennessee, of which Ramsey was also a director, collapsed due to overspeculation. The bank chose to pay off its largest depositors instead of its smaller (and less affluent) depositors, causing outrage throughout the region. Knoxville Whig newspaper editor and Methodist minister William "Parson" Brownlow, who had been at odds with Ramsey since the 1840s, sued on behalf of these depositors and won a civil judgement against Ramsey.

=== The Annals of Tennessee ===
Ramsey began accumulating historical documents pertaining to the state's history during the 1830s. He began writing The Annals of Tennessee in 1840, but the project stalled as Ramsey struggled with a lack of information regarding certain periods, and attempted to address certain contradictions in his source documents. A major catalyst for Ramsey during this period was his friendship with historian Lyman Draper, who first visited Ramsey in October 1844. Draper, who was compiling documents for a history of the Trans-Allegheny region, helped Ramsey fill in a number of gaps, and provided him with technical advice.

The Annals of Tennessee, which covers the state's history to 1800, was finally published in 1853. Contemporary historians such as Draper, George Bancroft, and Benson John Lossing, praised the Annals, while others, such as William B. Campbell and A. W. Putnam, derided it. The book sold moderately well, and a second edition was published within a few years. The 1860 edition of Ramsey's The Annals of Tennessee also features approximately 36 pages of display advertising for Lippincott & Grambo & Co.s Publications at the back section of the book, predominately selling religious books, sermons, and illustrations.

The book is an invaluable account of many of the state's early historical events, especially considering that many of the documents on which it was based were destroyed during the Civil War. Modern historians, however, criticize Ramsey for focusing almost solely on battles and biographies of key figures, while ignoring economic and social factors that contributed significantly to the state's early settlement. The book has also been criticized for its unbalanced organization, providing a torrent of details on some events and scant details on other, equally important events.

=== Secession crisis ===
Ramsey had long sought to bring a Deep South-style economy to East Tennessee. He believed the South was morally superior to the North, and detested the idea that Knoxville would become industrialized along the lines of northern manufacturing centers. This brought him into conflict with Brownlow and business leaders such as Perez Dickinson, who believed the region's abundant coal and iron resources made industrialization Knoxville's most lucrative option. Ramsey was also radically pro-slavery, going so far as to call for the reopening of the Atlantic slave trade.

During the secession crisis that followed Lincoln's election in November 1860, Ramsey grew increasingly frustrated with East Tennessee's refusal to align itself with the South. Ramsey suggested that most East Tennesseans were too "ignorant" to understand the secession issue, and accused Brownlow (who was pro-Union) of using the Whig to brainwash them. After the fall of Fort Sumter, Ramsey wrote to Governor Isham Harris, and suggested he bypass a voters' referendum on Tennessee's Union ties and simply dissolve them by proclamation.

Ramsey owned eight slaves in 1860 prior to the outbreak of the Civil War.

=== The Civil War ===
During the war, Ramsey served as a Confederate treasury agent, and two of his sons served in the Confederate Army. His eldest son, John Crozier Ramsey, was appointed Confederate States District Attorney of Knox County. In this capacity, the younger Ramsey issued indictments against the city's pro-Unionists, and in December 1861, had Brownlow arrested for treason. As rumors spread that the Confederate Army was planning to release Brownlow, the elder Ramsey wrote to Jefferson Davis, calling Brownlow the "prime mover and instigator" of Union sentiment in the region, and demanded he be court-martialed.

As the war raged on, Ramsey's fortunes collapsed. His son, Arthur, was killed in battle, his daughters Charlotte and Henrietta died, and two other sons were captured. When the Union Army occupied Knoxville in 1863, Ramsey and his family were forced to flee. His home, Mecklenburg, with its 4,000-volume library, was burned by a Union soldier (Ramsey claimed the arsonist had been hired by Brownlow). Brownlow seized Ramsey's townhouse in Knoxville, and had Ramsey's youngest daughter, Susan, expelled from the city. Ramsey's son was forced to sell the family's ancestral home in East Knoxville. Ramsey himself spent the latter half of the war in various cities around the region, continuously fleeing the Union Army's advance.

=== Later life ===
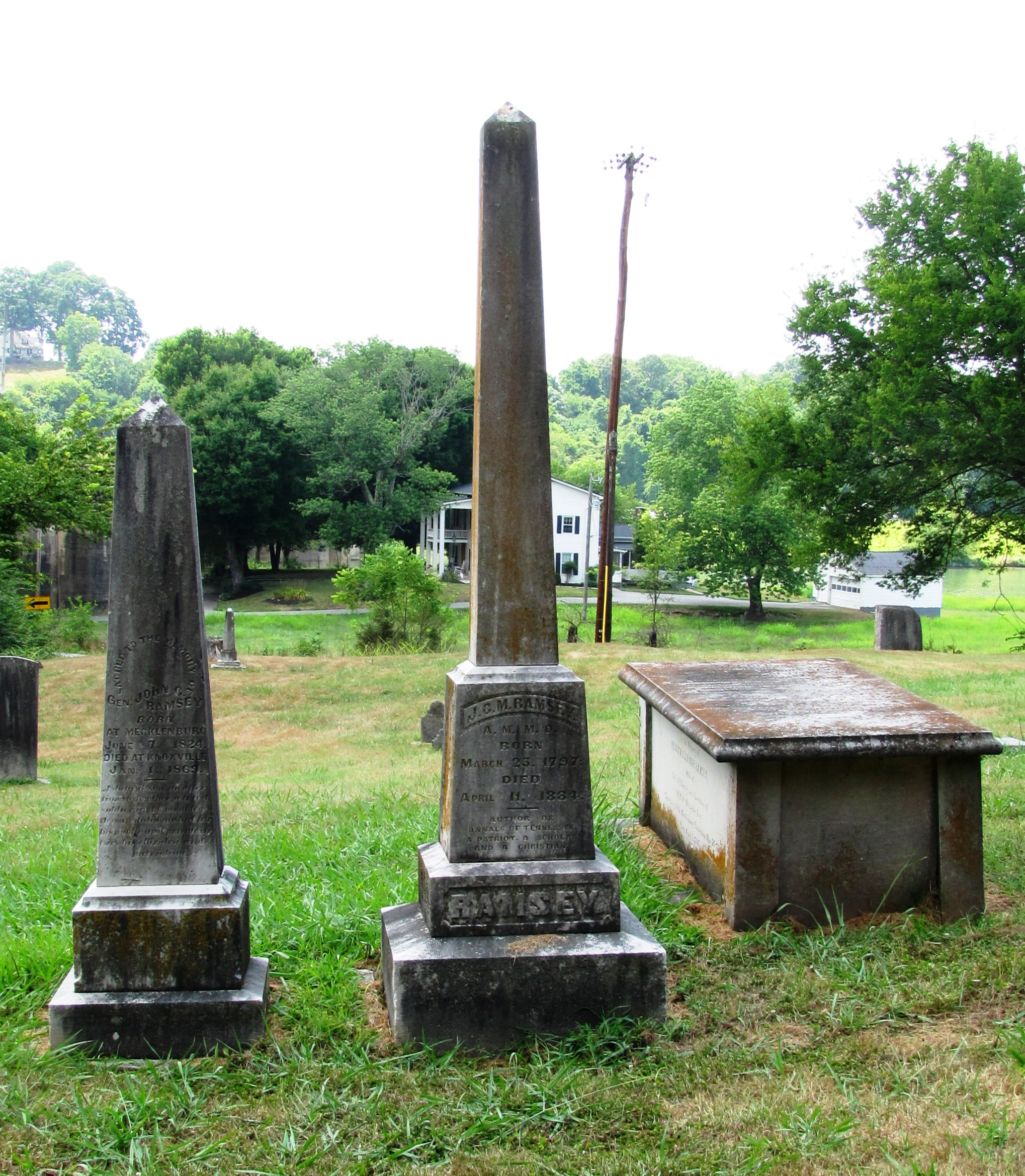
Ramsey family graves at Lebanon-in-the-Fork; J.G.M's is the tall obelisk in the middle

At the end of the war, the Ramseys wound up in a house in Charlotte, North Carolina, which they called "Exile's Retreat." Brownlow, now governor of Tennessee, refused to pardon Ramsey, and ordered his arrest. Ramsey's friends, however, managed to obtain for him a presidential pardon from Andrew Johnson, issued in November 1865. Ramsey returned to Knoxville 1872. He began practicing medicine again, and managed to regain some of his property through a series of complicated lawsuits.

Within various letters from 1875 collected for his edited "Autobiography and Letters" by William B. Hesseltine, Ramsey noted that he had suffered an '...ignoble accident from an unruly horse", that he had a crushed limb, that he was a "cripple", that he used crutches, and that he was confined to his room.

When Ramsey died in 1884, the flag at the Tennessee State Capitol was lowered to half-staff. The Knoxville Chronicle reported that Ramsey's funeral procession was the largest in the history of Knoxville. Ramsey was buried nearby his father at the Lebanon in the Forks Cemetery, near the confluence of the French Broad and Holston rivers at the beginning of the Tennessee River.

== Legacy ==
During his lifetime, Ramsey helped establish the East Tennessee Medical Society, serving as its first president, as well as the East Tennessee Historical Society, serving as its first recording secretary. After the war, he served as president of the Tennessee Historical Society. The stone house of Ramsey's father, completed the year of Ramsey's birth, still stands on Thorngrove Pike in East Knoxville, and is currently a museum.

Ramsey was the inspiration for the George Washington Harris short story, "The Doctor's Bill," which describes a doctor's comical attempt to obtain payment from the county for the treatment of a local pauper. Ramsey, called "Doctor Blank" in the story, probably told the story to Harris at some point. The story also mentions Ramsey's old mentor, Joseph Strong ("Dr. S").

While criticized by modern historians, the Annals of Tennessee remains an important source of factual information regarding the state's early settlement, and has been republished several times. In 1918, the East Tennessee Historical Society published a short pamphlet written by Ramsey that details the history of the Lebanon-in-the-Fork Presbyterian Church. In 1954, the Tennessee Historical Commission published an autobiography Ramsey had written to venerate his family's actions during the Civil War, along with some of his personal correspondence.

== See also ==
- John Haywood "Father of Tennessee History"
- Thomas William Humes
- Oliver Perry Temple
- Samuel Cole Williams
