= James White's Fort =

18th century fort and settlement

Coordinates: 35.9647°N 83.9167°W

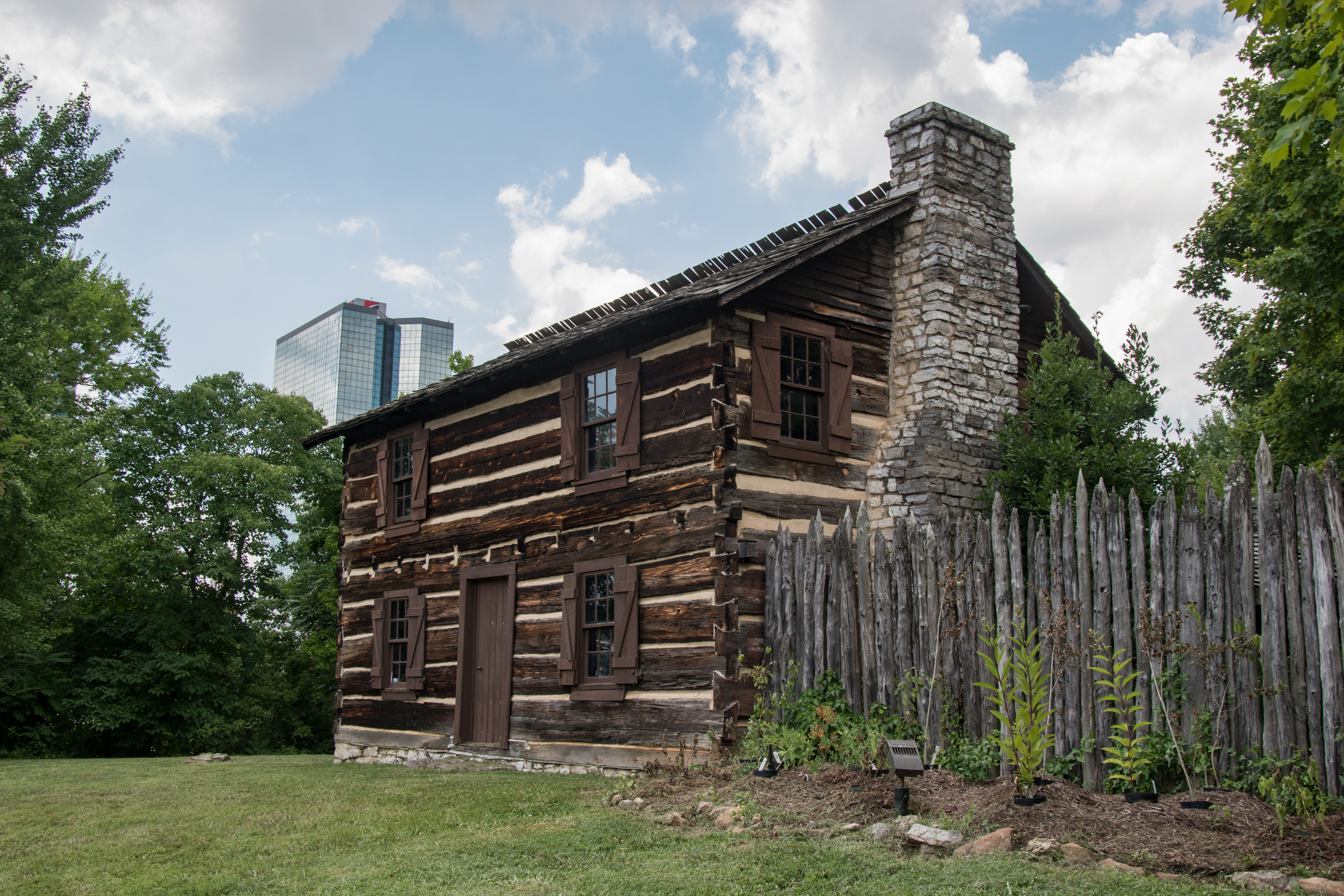
James White home in Knoxville

James White's Fort, also known as White's Fort, was an 18th-century fort and settlement that became Knoxville, Tennessee, in the United States.

The settlement of White's Fort began in 1786 by James White, a militia officer during the American Revolutionary War. When William Blount, the territorial governor of the Southwest Territory, moved the territorial capital to White's Fort in 1791, he renamed it Knoxville in honor of Henry Knox, the American Revolutionary War general and President George Washington's secretary of war.

The fort began as a cabin near what is now the corner of State Street and Clinch Avenue. This cabin soon became the center of a cluster of fortified log structures known as White's Fort. The original cabin later became the kitchen of the Kennedy house, which was built in the 1830s. In 1906, when the Kennedy house was demolished for development, Isaiah Ford bought the log structure and moved it to Woodlawn Pike. It was purchased again in 1960 by the City Association of Women's Clubs; in 1968, the timbers were reconstructed as part of the fort. The fort still stands on a bluff near its original location. Seven log cabins and the stockade fence remain. The cabins house pioneer artifacts and furnishings.

== See also ==
- History of Knoxville, Tennessee
