= Knoxville, Tennessee =

Knoxville
- City
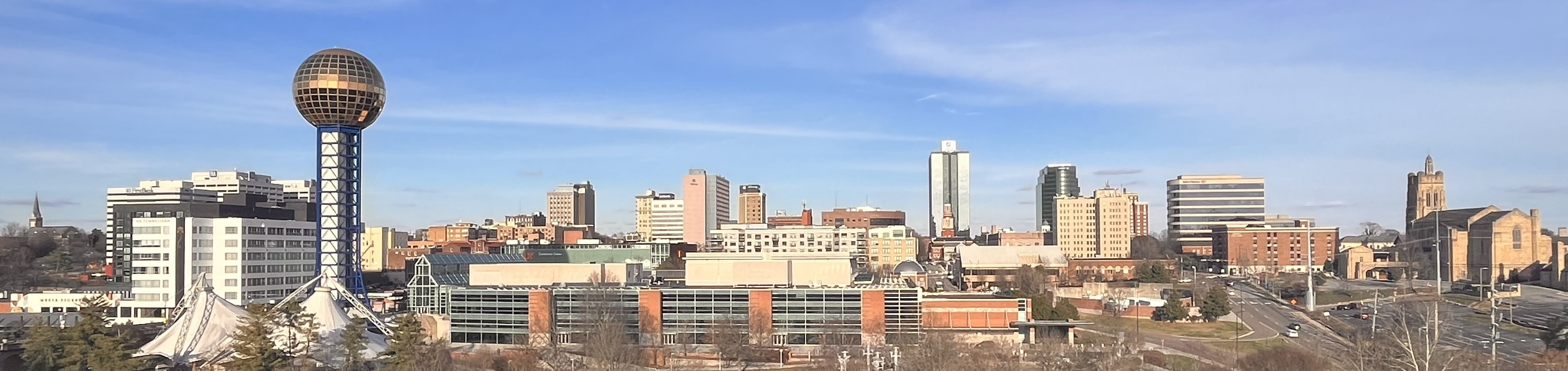
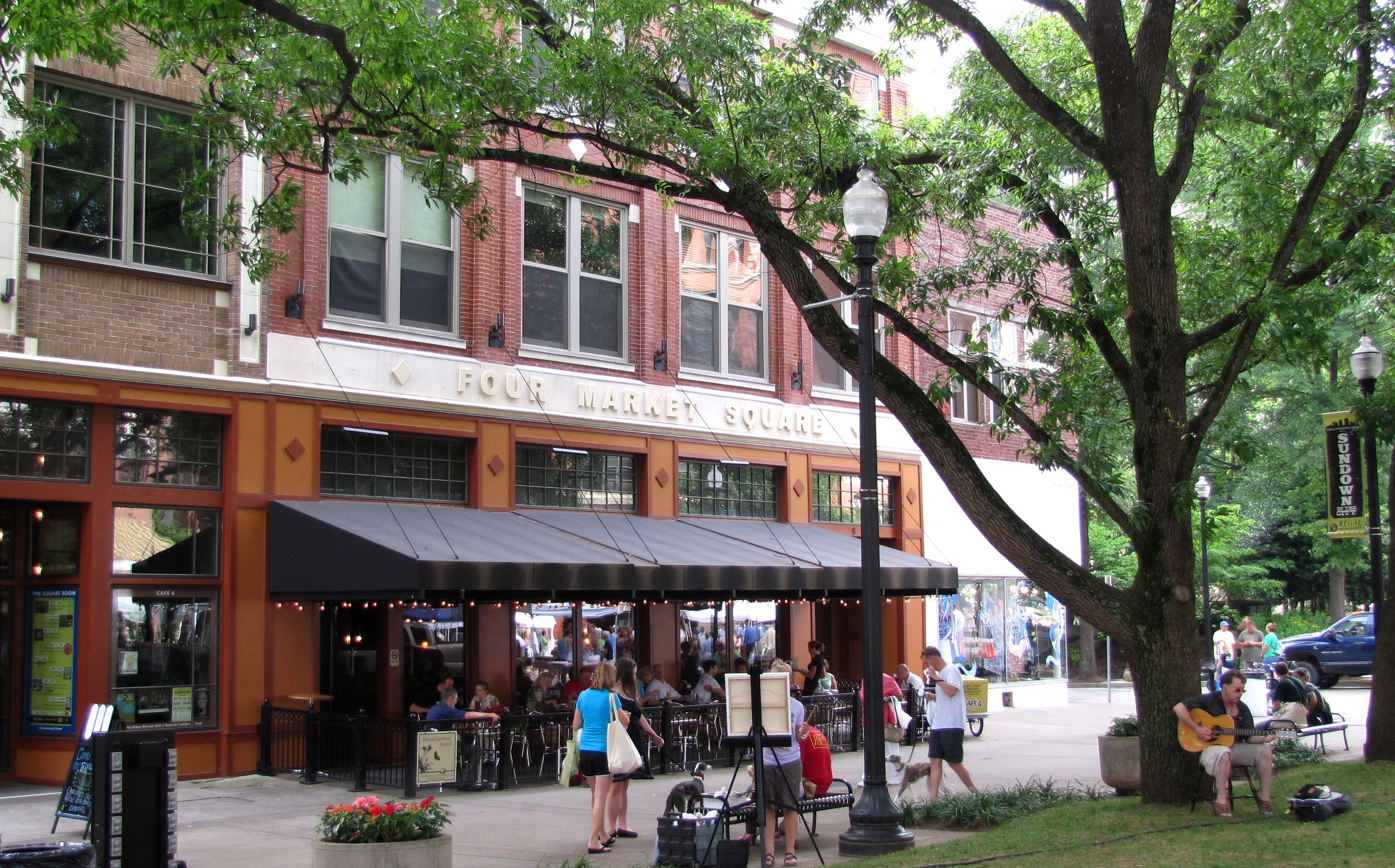
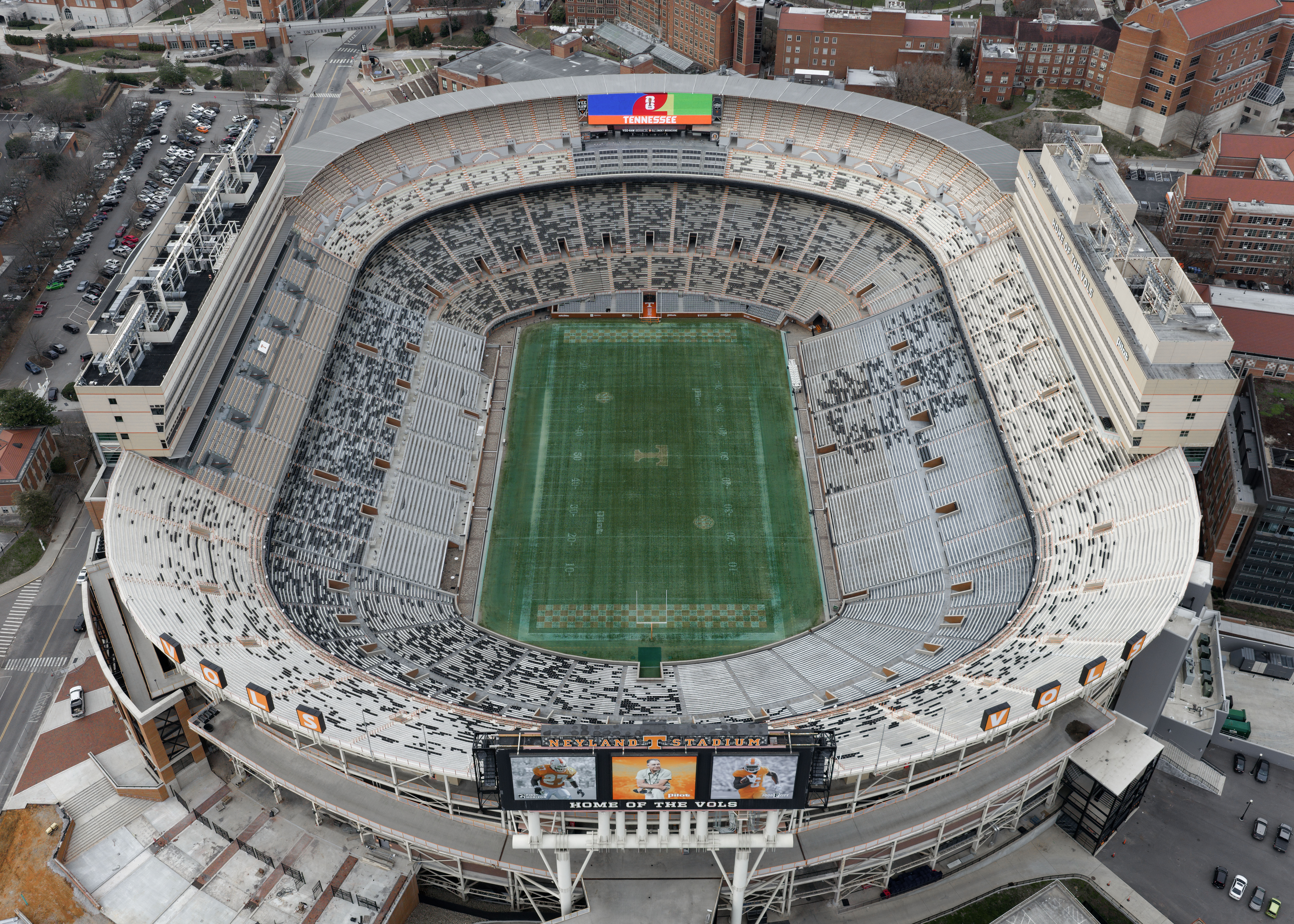
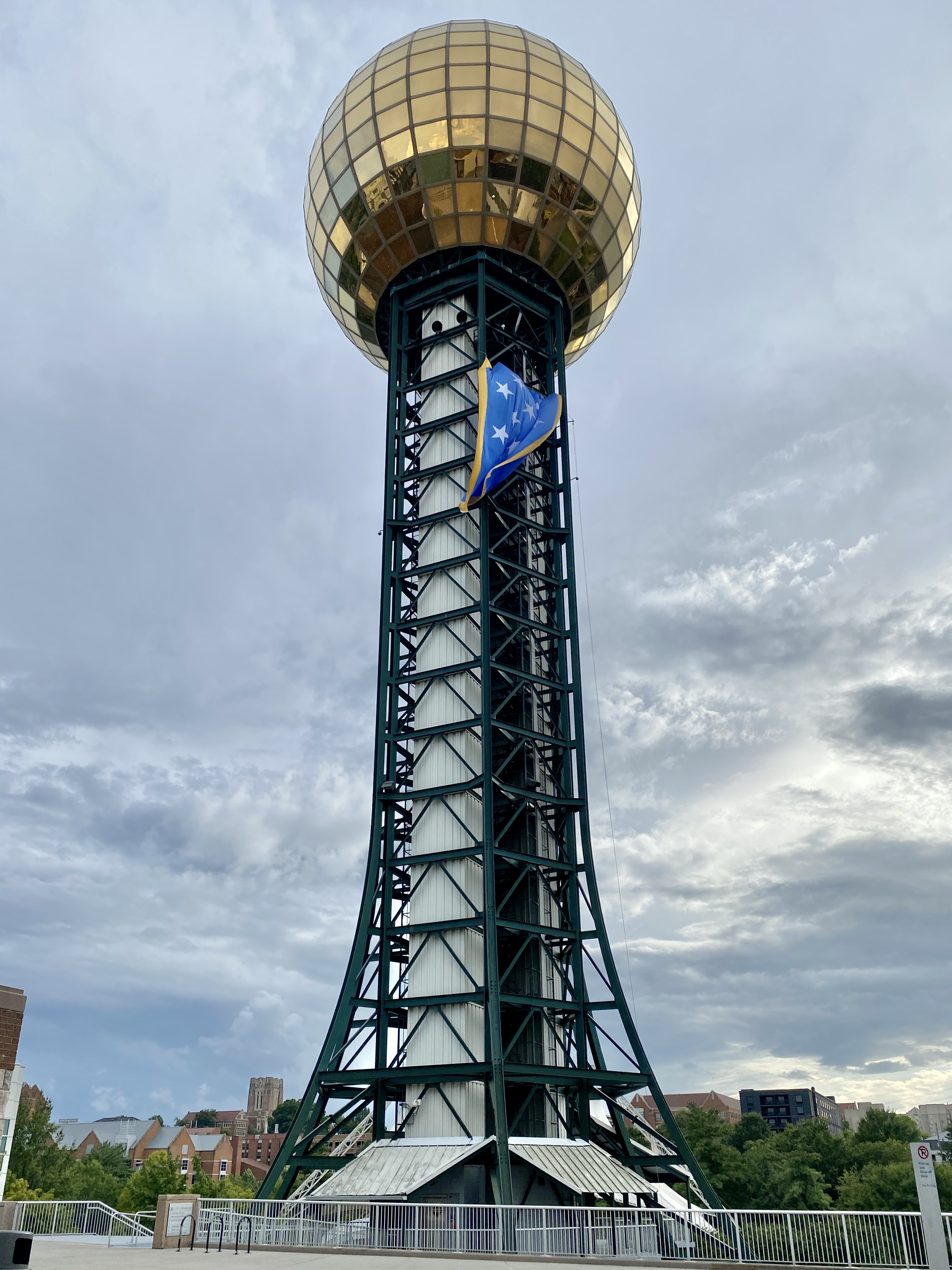
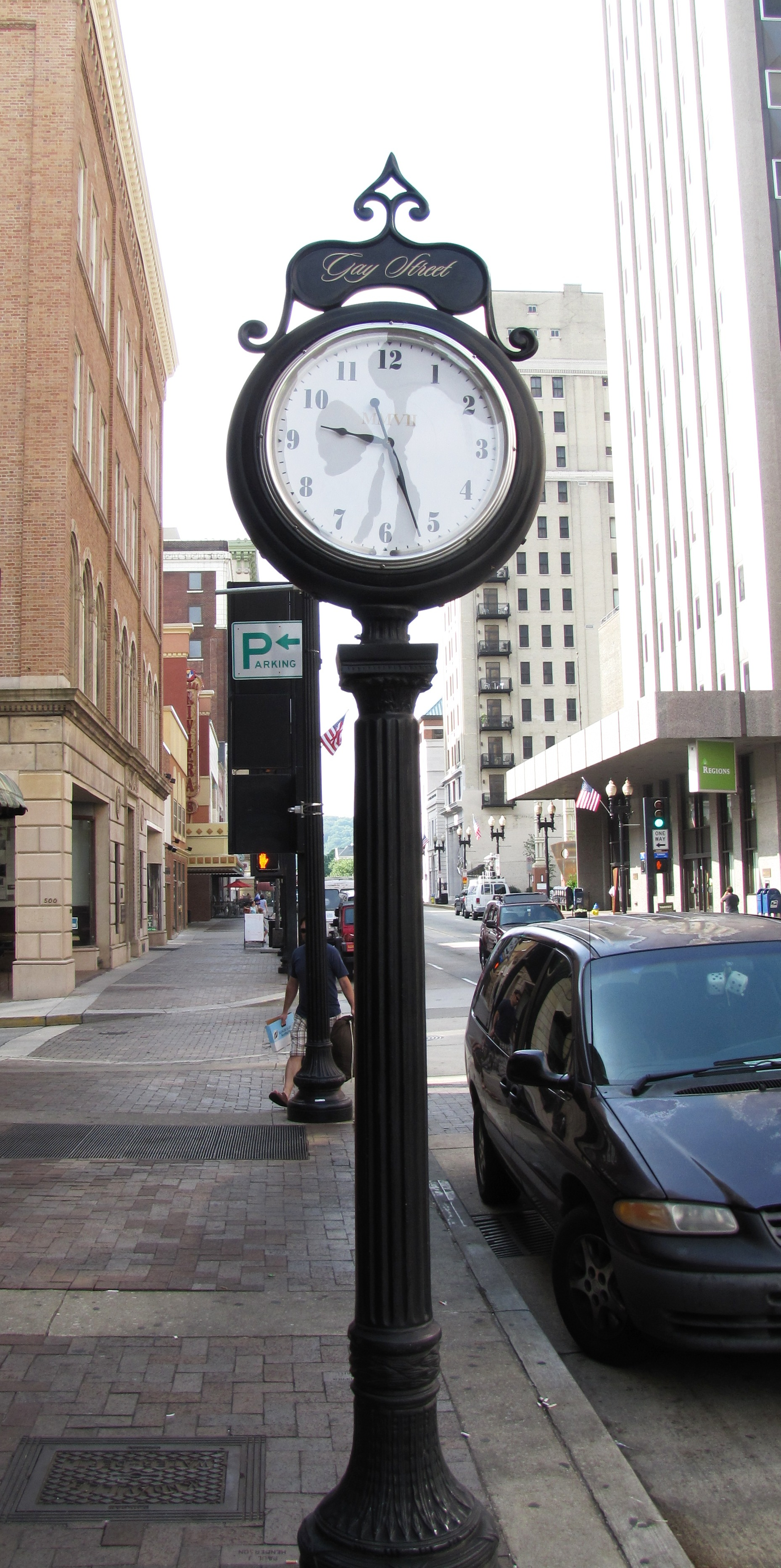
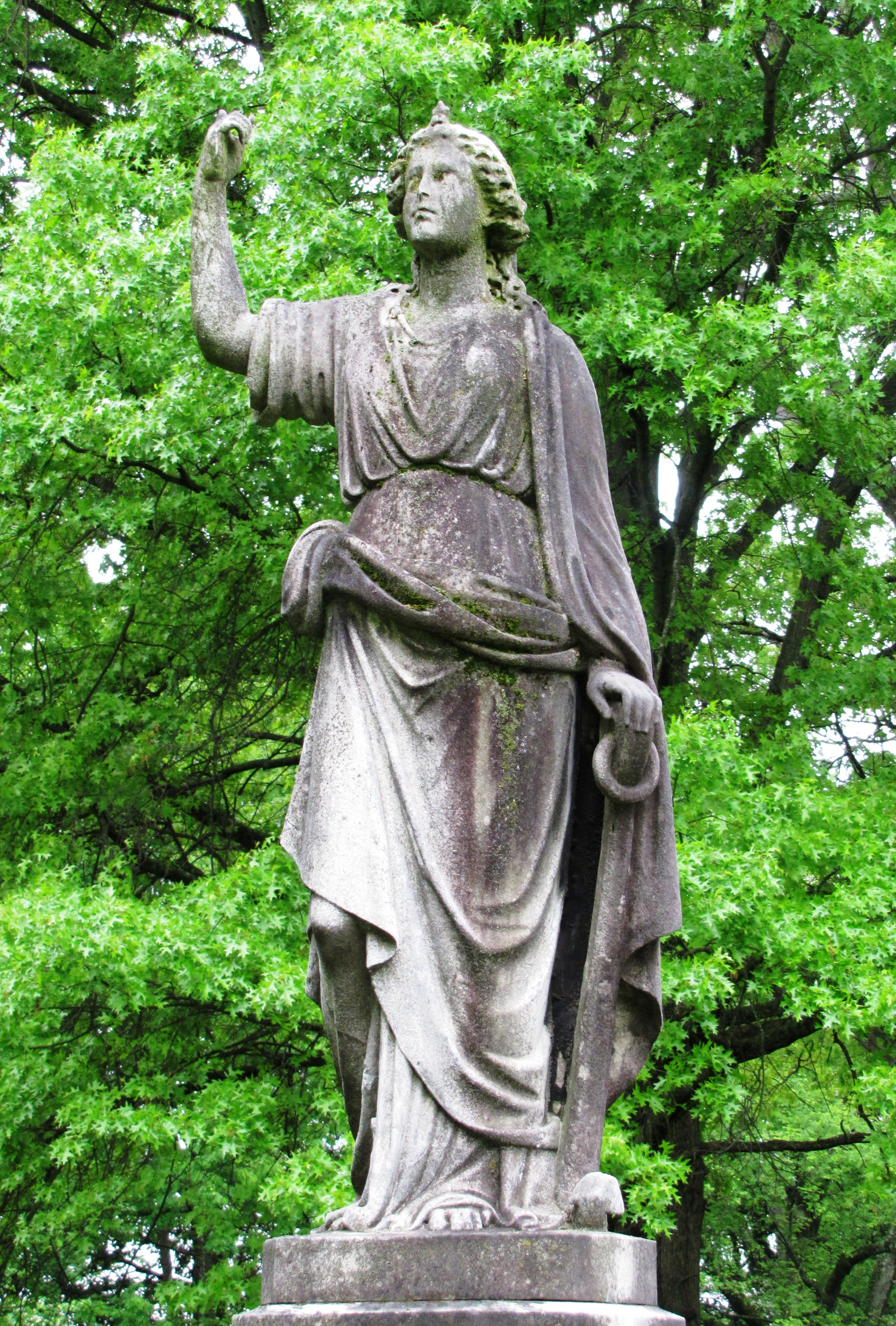
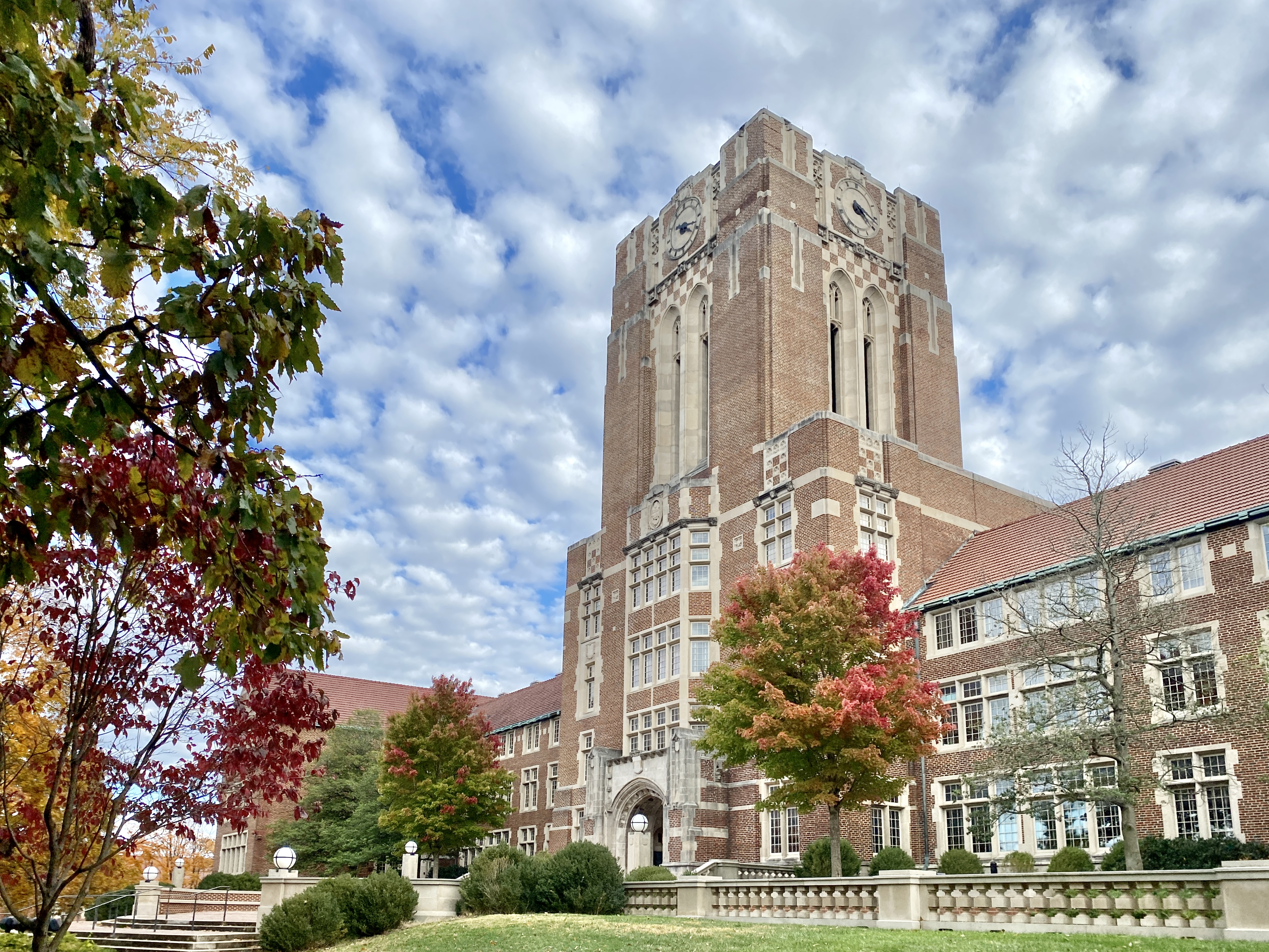
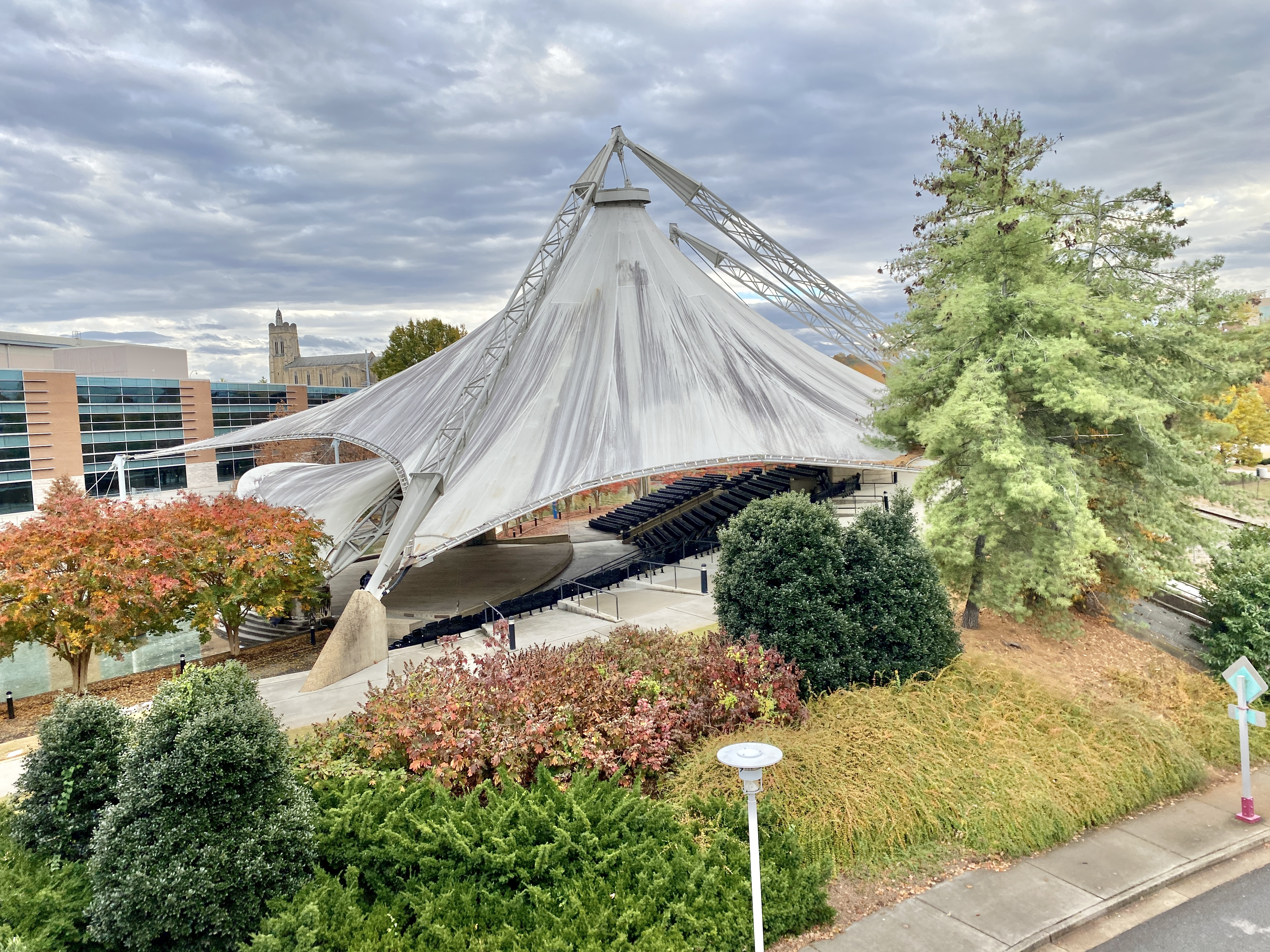
- Downtown Knoxville skyline Market Square Neyland Stadium Sunsphere Gay Street Old Gray Cemetery University of Tennessee Tennessee Amphitheater

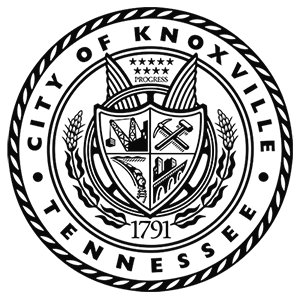
- Flag Seal Logo
- Nicknames: Marble City, Heart of the Valley, Queen City of the Mountains, K-Town, Scruffy City, Gateway to the Great Smoky Mountains, Knox Vegas.
- Location of Knoxville in Knox County, Tennessee.

- Location in Tennessee Location in the United States Location in North America
- Coordinates: 35.9617°N 83.9232°W
- Country: United States
- State: Tennessee
- County: Knox County
- Settled: 1786; 240 years ago
- Founded: 1791; 235 years ago
- Incorporated: 1815; 211 years ago
- Founder: James White
- Named for: Henry Knox

Government
  - Type: Mayor–council
  - Mayor: Indya Kincannon (D) (Note: Tennessee Code 2-13-208 requires all municipal elections and their respective offices to be nonpartisan. However, Kincannon is known to be a member of the Democratic Party)
  - Vice-Mayor: Lynn Fugate (Note: The Vice-Mayor is selected by the City Council from its membership for a two-year term.)
  - City Council: Council Members: Karyn Adams (1st Dist.); Nathan Honeycutt (2nd Dist.); Doug Lloyd (3rd Dist.); Matthew DeBardelaben (4th Dist.); Charles Thomas (5th Dist.); Denzel Grant (6th Dist.); Lynn Fugate (At-Large Seat A); Debbie Helsley (At-Large Seat B); Amelia Parker (At-Large Seat C)

Area
  - City: 104.25 sq mi (270.01 km^{2})
  - Land: 98.73 sq mi (255.72 km^{2})
  - Water: 5.52 sq mi (14.30 km^{2}) 5.4%
- Elevation: 886 ft (270 m)

Population (2020)
  - City: 190,740
  - Rank: US: 132nd TN: 3rd
  - Density: 1,931.9/sq mi (745.91/km^{2})
  - Urban: 597,257 (US: 72nd)
  - Urban density: 1,383/sq mi (533.9/km^{2})
  - Metro: 957,608 (US: 60th)
  - CSA: 1,222,320 (US: 49th)
- Demonym: Knoxvillian
- Time zone: UTC−5 (EST)
  - Summer (DST): UTC−4 (EDT)
- Zip code: 37901-37902, 37909, 37912, 37914-37920-37924, 37927-37934, 37938-37940, 37950, 37995-37998
- Area code: 865
- FIPS code: 47-40000
- GNIS feature ID: 1648562
- Website: knoxvilletn.gov

Knoxville is a city in Knox County, Tennessee, United States, and its county seat. Located on the Tennessee River within the Appalachian Mountains, it is the largest city in the Grand Division of East Tennessee. Knoxville had a population of 190,740 at the 2020 census, making it the third-most-populous city in Tennessee. The Knoxville metropolitan area has an estimated 958,000 residents.

Aerial image of the Tennessee River through Knoxville

Settled in 1786, Knoxville was the first capital of Tennessee. The city struggled with geographic isolation throughout the early 19th century before the arrival of the railroad in 1855 led to an economic boom. The city was bitterly divided over the issue of secession during the American Civil War and was occupied alternately by the Confederate and Union armies, which culminated in the Battle of Fort Sanders in 1863. Following the war, Knoxville grew rapidly and became a major wholesaling and manufacturing center until the 1920s when the city's economy began to stagnate. During the Great Depression, Knoxville's manufacturing sector collapsed, the downtown area declined, and city leaders became entrenched in highly partisan political fights. Hosting the 1982 World's Fair helped reinvigorate the city, and revitalization initiatives by city leaders and private developers have spurred growth in the city, especially downtown.

Knoxville is home to the University of Tennessee's flagship campus, and the Tennessee Volunteers athletic teams are popular in the surrounding area.

Knoxville is home to the Tennessee Supreme Court's courthouse for East Tennessee. It serves as the headquarters of the Tennessee Valley Authority and several national and regional companies, including Pilot Company, Clayton Homes, Bush Brothers, and H. T. Hackney Company.

As one of the largest cities in the Appalachian region, Knoxville has positioned itself in recent years as a repository of Appalachian culture and gateway to Great Smoky Mountains National Park.

== History ==
=== Early history ===
The first people to form substantial settlements in what is now Knoxville were indigenous people who arrived during the Woodland period (c. 1000 B.C. to 1000 A.D.). One of the oldest artificial structures in Knoxville is a burial mound constructed during the early Mississippian culture period (c. 1000–1400 A.D.). The earthwork mound was preserved, but the University of Tennessee campus developed around it.

Other prehistoric sites include an Early Woodland habitation area at the confluence of the Tennessee River and Knob Creek (near the Knox–Blount county line) and Dallas phase Mississippian villages at Post Oak Island (also along the river near the Knox–Blount line) and at Bussell Island (at the mouth of the Little Tennessee River near Lenoir City).

By the 18th century, the Cherokee, an Iroquoian language people, had become the dominant tribe in the East Tennessee region. They are believed to have migrated from the Great Lakes region centuries earlier. They were frequently at war with the Creek and Shawnee.

The Cherokee people called the Knoxville area kuwanda'talun'yi, which means "mulberry place". Most Cherokee habitation in the area concentrated in what American colonists called the Overhill settlements along the Little Tennessee River, southwest of Knoxville.

The first white traders and explorers arrived in the Tennessee Valley in the late 17th century. There is significant evidence that Spanish explorer Hernando de Soto visited Bussell Island in 1540.

However, the first major recorded Euro-American presence in the Knoxville area was the Timberlake Expedition, which passed through the area in December 1761 at the confluence of the Holston River and French Broad River into the Tennessee River. A British soldier and Anglo-American emissary from the Thirteen Colonies to the Overhill settlements, Henry Timberlake appreciated the Tennessee's deep waters after his party had spent several weeks struggling down the relatively shallow Holston.

=== Settlement ===
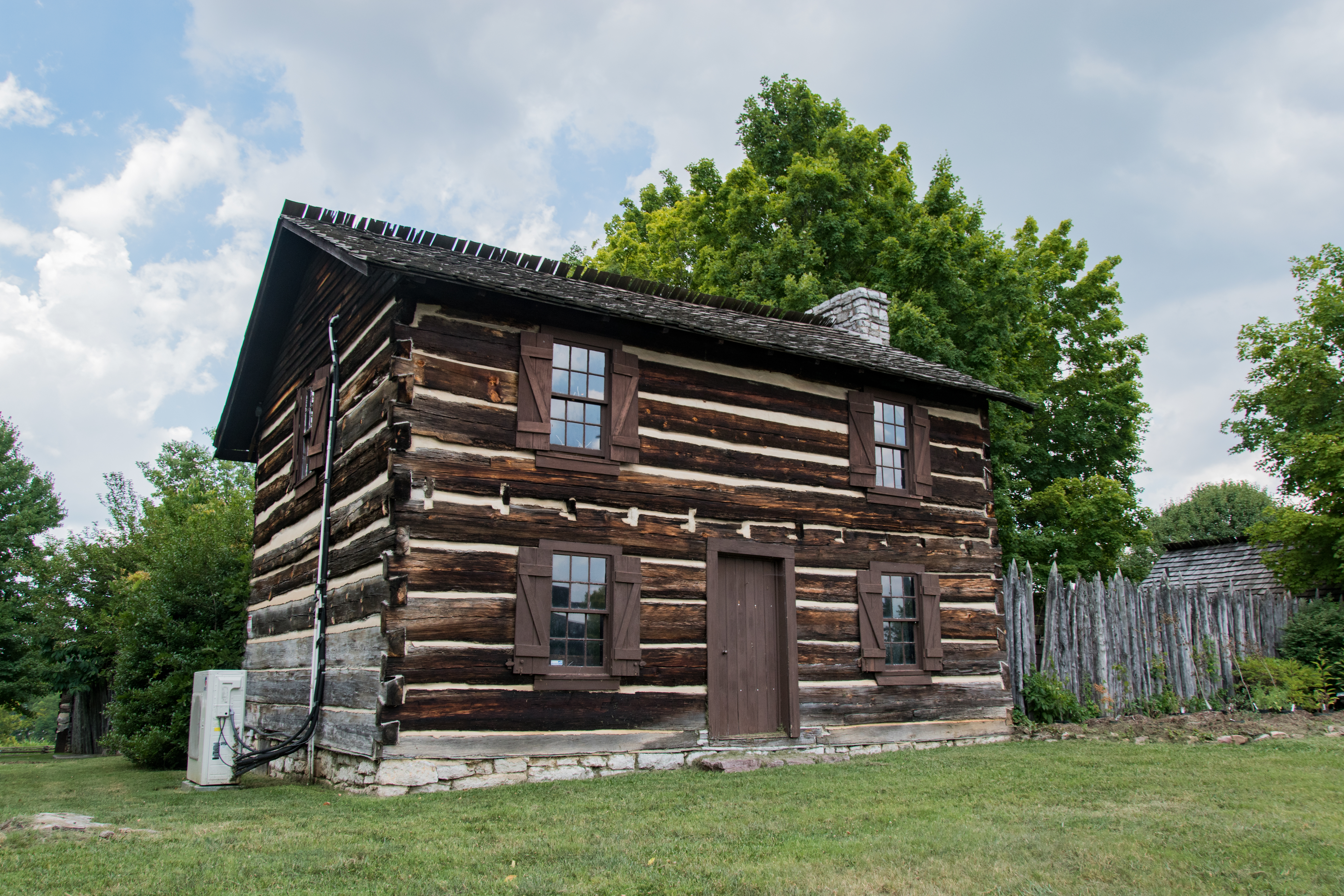
James White's Fort in downtown Knoxville

The end of the French and Indian War in 1763 and the confusion brought about by the American Revolution led to a drastic increase in Euro-American settlement west of the Appalachian Mountains. By the 1780s, white settlers were already established in the Holston and French Broad valleys. In 1785 the U.S. Congress ordered all illegal settlers out of the valley but to little effect. Settlers continued to trickle into Cherokee lands, and tensions between the settlers and the Cherokee rose.

In 1786, James White, a Revolutionary War officer, and his friend James Connor built White's Fort near the mouth of First Creek, on land White had purchased three years earlier. In 1790, White's son-in-law, Charles McClung—who had arrived from Pennsylvania the previous year—surveyed White's holdings between First Creek and Second Creek for the establishment of a town. McClung drew up sixty-four 0.5-acre (0.20 ha) lots. The waterfront was set aside for a town common. Two lots were set aside for a church and graveyard (First Presbyterian Church, founded 1792). Four lots were set aside for a school. That school was eventually chartered as Blount College and it served as the starting point for the University of Tennessee, which uses Blount College's founding date of 1794 as its own.

In 1790, President George Washington appointed North Carolina surveyor William Blount governor of the newly created Territory South of the River Ohio. One of Blount's first tasks was to meet with the Cherokee and establish territorial boundaries and resolve the issue of illegal settlers. This he accomplished almost immediately with the Treaty of Holston, which was negotiated and signed at White's Fort in 1791. Blount originally wanted to place the territorial capital at the confluence of the Clinch River and Tennessee River (now Kingston), but when the Cherokee refused to cede this land, Blount chose White's Fort. Blount named the new capital Knoxville after Revolutionary War General and Secretary of War Henry Knox, who at the time was Blount's immediate superior.

Problems immediately arose from the Treaty of Holston. Blount believed that he had "purchased" much of what is now East Tennessee when the treaty was signed in 1791. However, the terms of the treaty came under dispute, culminating in ongoing violence on both sides. When the government invited Cherokee chief Hanging Maw for negotiations in 1793, Knoxville settlers attacked the Cherokee against orders, killing the chief's wife. Peace was renegotiated in 1794.

=== Antebellum era ===
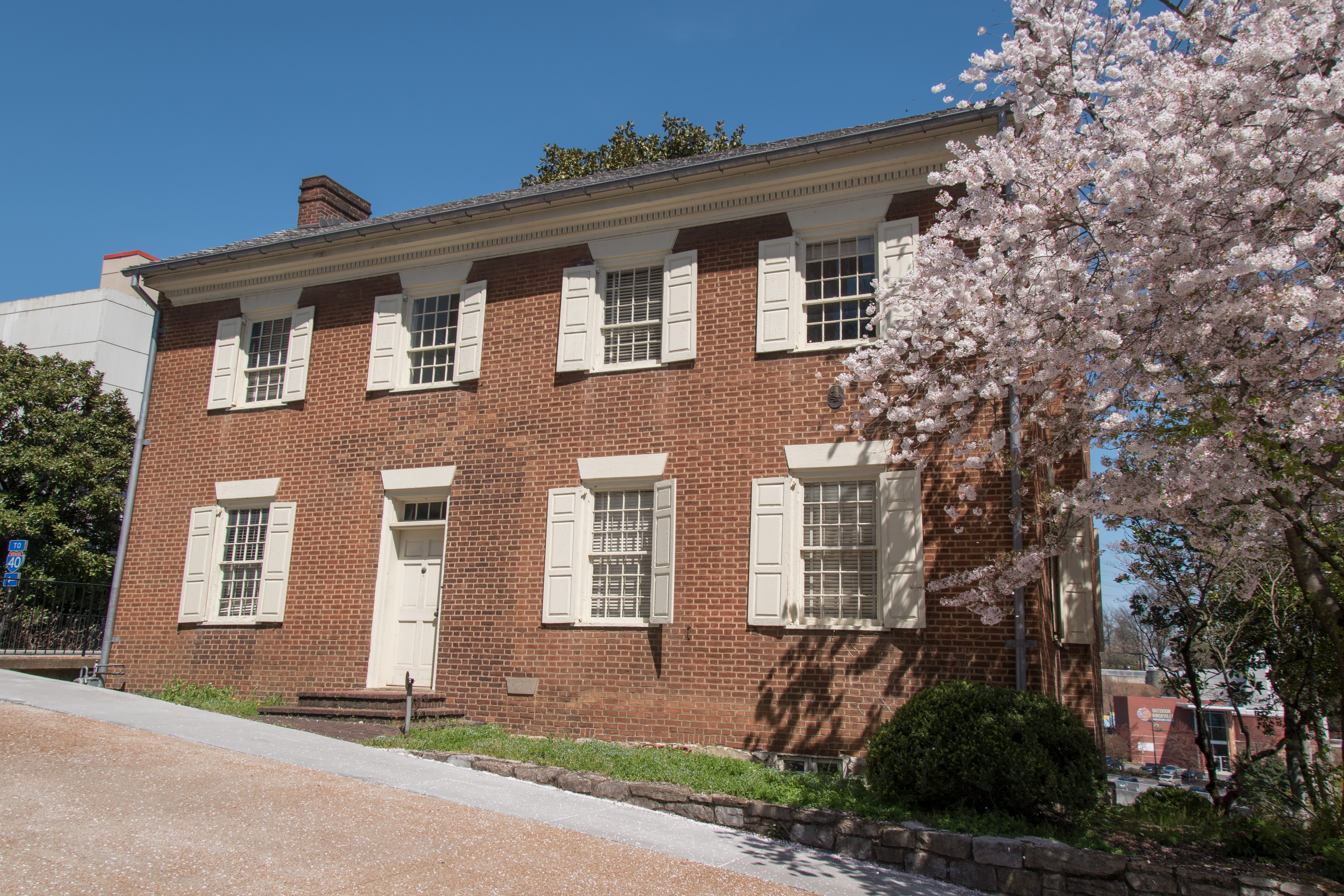
The Craighead–Jackson House in Knoxville, built in 1818

Knoxville served as capital of the Southwest Territory and as capital of Tennessee (admitted as a state in 1796) until 1817, when the capital was moved to Murfreesboro. Early Knoxville has been described as an "alternately quiet and rowdy river town". Early issues of the Knoxville Gazette—the first newspaper published in Tennessee—are filled with accounts of murder, theft, and hostile Cherokee attacks. Abishai Thomas, a friend of William Blount, visited Knoxville in 1794 and wrote that, while he was impressed by the town's modern frame buildings, the town had "seven taverns" and no church.

Knoxville initially thrived as a way station for travelers and migrants heading west. Its location at the confluence of three major rivers in the Tennessee Valley brought flatboat and later steamboat traffic to its waterfront in the first half of the 19th century, and Knoxville quickly developed into a regional merchandising center. Local agricultural products—especially tobacco, corn, and whiskey—were traded for cotton, which was grown in the Deep South. The population of Knoxville more than doubled in the 1850s with the arrival of the East Tennessee and Georgia Railroad in 1855.

Among the most prominent citizens of Knoxville during the Antebellum years was James White's son, Hugh Lawson White (1773–1840). White first served as a judge and state senator, before being nominated by the state legislature to replace Andrew Jackson in the U.S. Senate in 1825. In 1836, White ran unsuccessfully for president, representing the Whig Party.

=== American Civil War ===
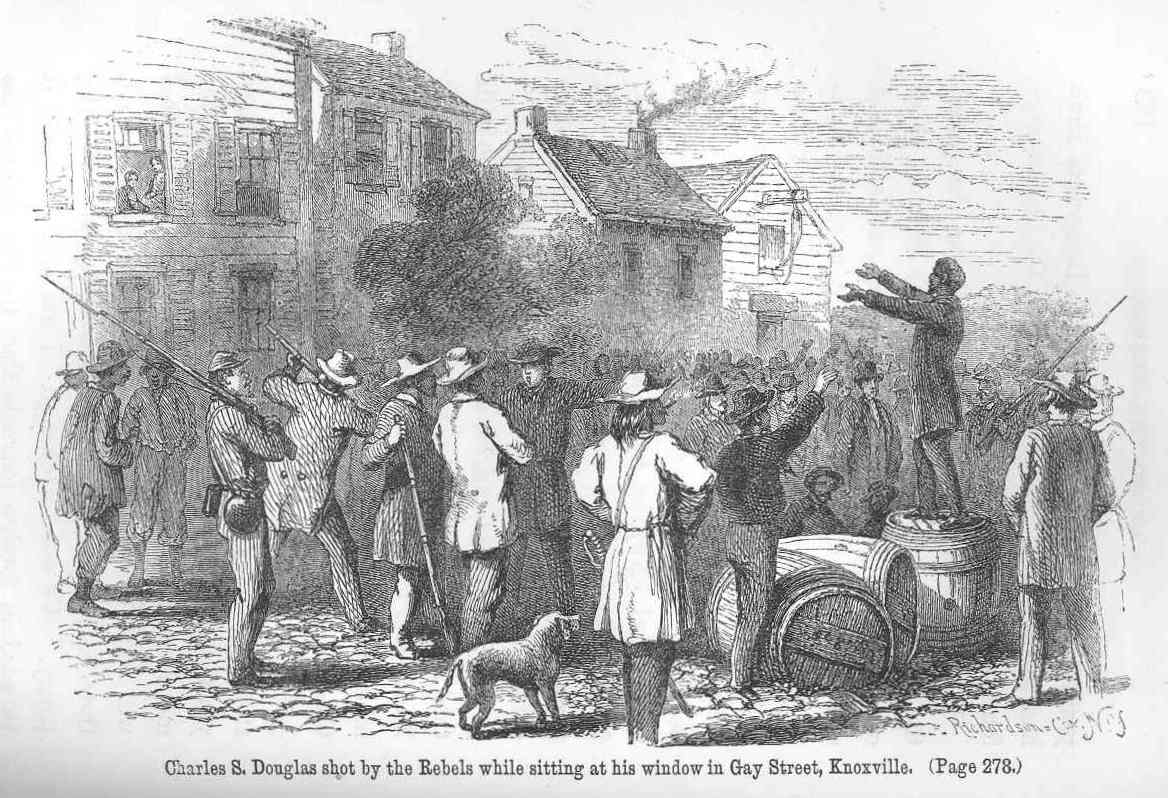
Engraving of a Confederate soldier firing at Union supporter Charles Douglas on Gay Street in Knoxville in late 1861

Anti-slavery and anti-secession sentiment ran high in East Tennessee in the years leading up to the Civil War. William "Parson" Brownlow, the radical publisher of the Knoxville Whig, was one of the region's leading anti-secessionists (although he strongly defended the practice of slavery). Blount County, just south of Knoxville, had developed into a center of abolitionist activity, due in part to its relatively large Quaker faction and the anti-slavery president of Maryville College, Isaac Anderson. The Greater Warner Tabernacle AME Zion Church was reportedly a station on the Underground Railroad.

Business interests, however, guided largely by Knoxville's trade connections with cotton-growing centers to the south, contributed to the development of a strong pro-secession movement within the city. The city's pro-secessionists included among their ranks J. G. M. Ramsey, a prominent historian whose father had built the Ramsey House in 1797.

Thus, while East Tennessee and greater Knox County voted decisively against secession in 1861, the city of Knoxville favored secession by a 2–1 margin. In late May 1861, just before the secession vote, delegates of the East Tennessee Convention met at Temperance Hall in Knoxville in hopes of keeping Tennessee in the Union. After Tennessee voted to secede in June, the convention met in Greeneville and attempted to create a separate Union-aligned state in East Tennessee.

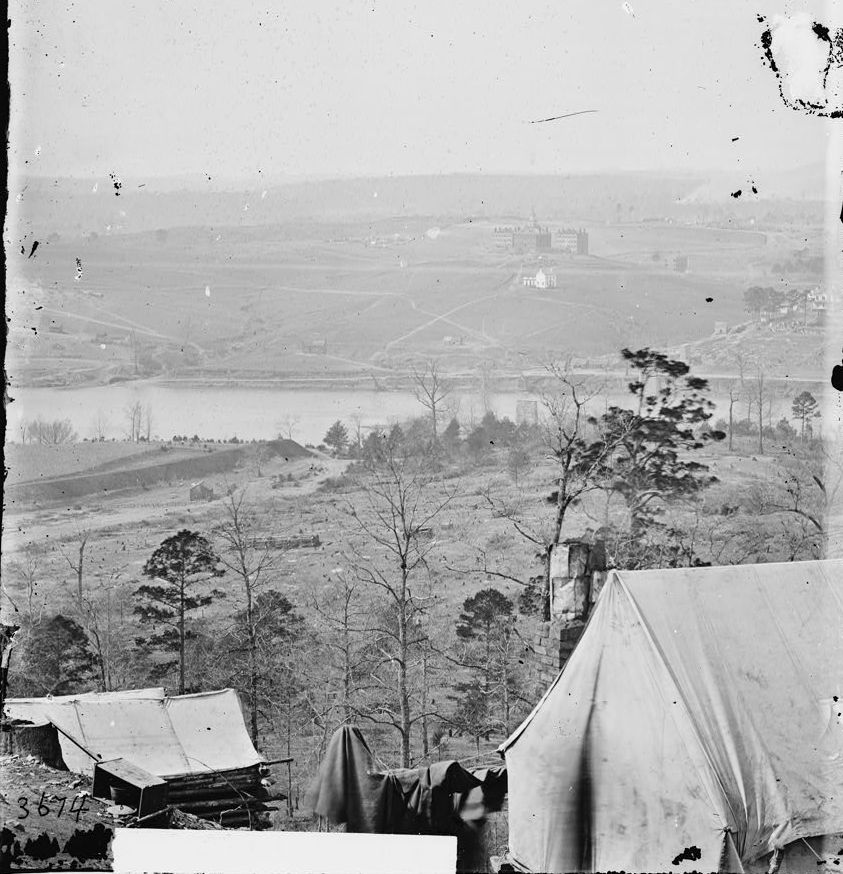
Photograph showing the aftermath of the siege of Knoxville, December 1863

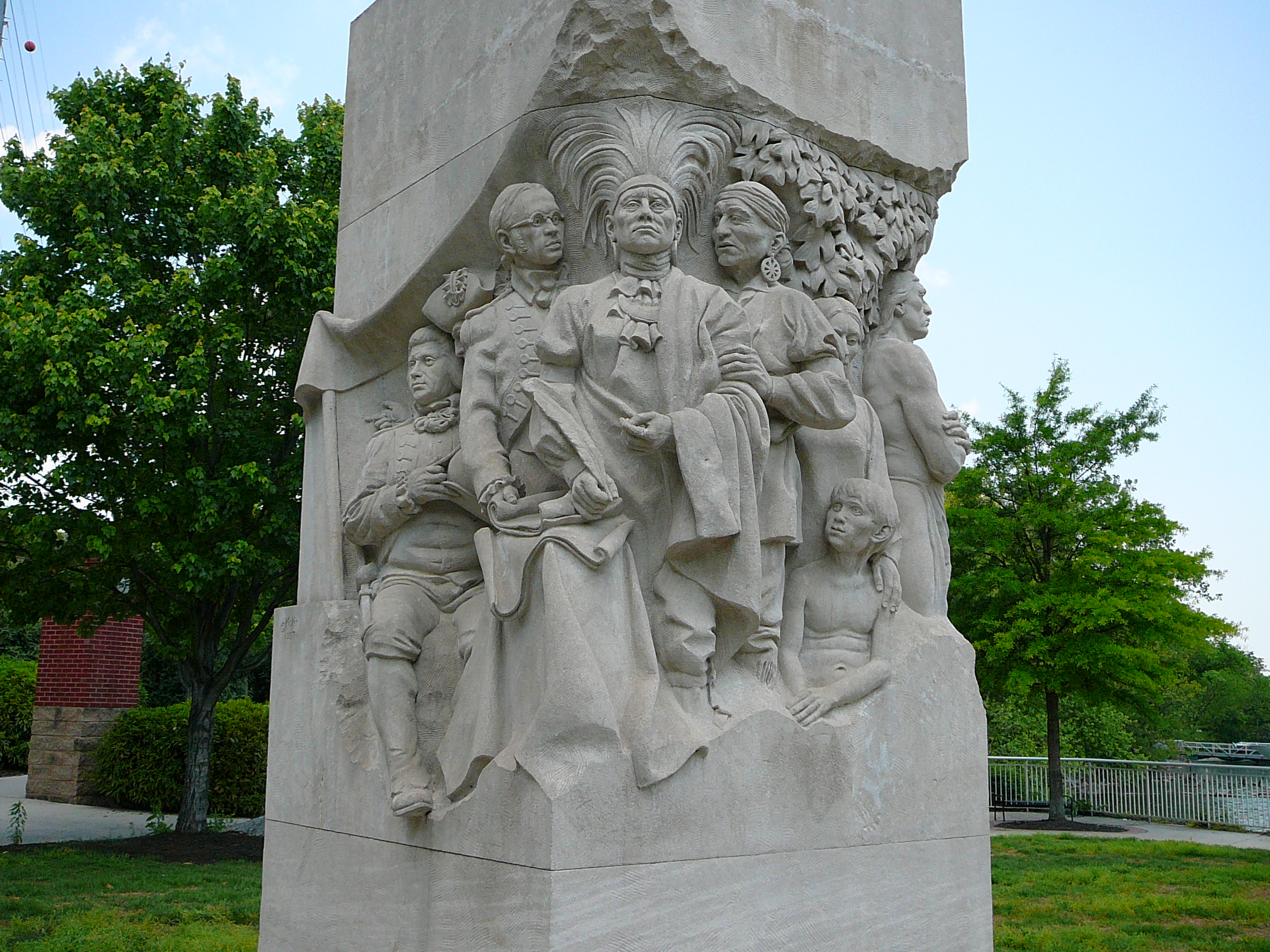
Statue representing the signing of the Treaty of the Holston in downtown Knoxville

In July 1861, after Tennessee had joined the Confederacy, General Felix Zollicoffer arrived in Knoxville as commander of the District of East Tennessee. While initially lenient toward the city's Union sympathizers, Zollicoffer instituted martial law in November, after pro-Union guerrillas burned seven of the city's bridges. The command of the district passed briefly to George Crittenden and then to Kirby Smith, who launched an unsuccessful invasion of Kentucky in August 1862. In early 1863, General Simon Buckner took command of Confederate forces in Knoxville. Anticipating a Union invasion, Buckner fortified Fort Loudon (in West Knoxville, not to be confused with the colonial fort to the southwest) and began constructing earthworks throughout the city. However, the approach of stronger Union forces under Ambrose Burnside in the summer of 1863 forced Buckner to evacuate Knoxville before the earthworks were completed.

Burnside arrived in early September 1863, beginning the Knoxville campaign. Like the Confederates, he immediately began fortifying the city. The Union forces rebuilt Fort Loudon and erected 12 other forts and batteries flanked by entrenchments around the city. Burnside moved a pontoon bridge upstream from Loudon, allowing Union forces to cross the river and to build a series of forts along the heights of south Knoxville, including Fort Stanley and Fort Dickerson.

As Burnside was fortifying Knoxville, a Confederate army under Braxton Bragg defeated Union forces under William Rosecrans at the Battle of Chickamauga (near the Tennessee-Georgia line) and laid siege to Chattanooga. On November 3, 1863, the Confederates sent General James Longstreet to attack Burnside at Knoxville and prevent him from reinforcing the Union at Chattanooga. Longstreet wanted to attack the city from the south, but lacking the necessary pontoon bridges he was forced to cross the river further downstream at Loudon on November 14 and march against the city's heavily fortified western section. On November 15, General Joseph Wheeler unsuccessfully attempted to dislodge Union forces in the heights of south Knoxville, and the following day Longstreet failed to cut off retreating Union forces at the Battle of Campbell's Station (now Farragut).

On November 18, Union General William P. Sanders was mortally wounded while conducting delaying maneuvers west of Knoxville, and Fort Loudon was renamed Fort Sanders in his honor. On November 29, following a two-week siege, the Confederates attacked Fort Sanders but failed after a fierce 20-minute engagement. On December 4, after word of the Confederate defeat at Chattanooga reached Longstreet, he broke his siege of Knoxville. The Union victories in the Knoxville campaign and at Chattanooga put much of East Tennessee under Union control for the rest of the war.

=== Reconstruction and the Industrial Age ===
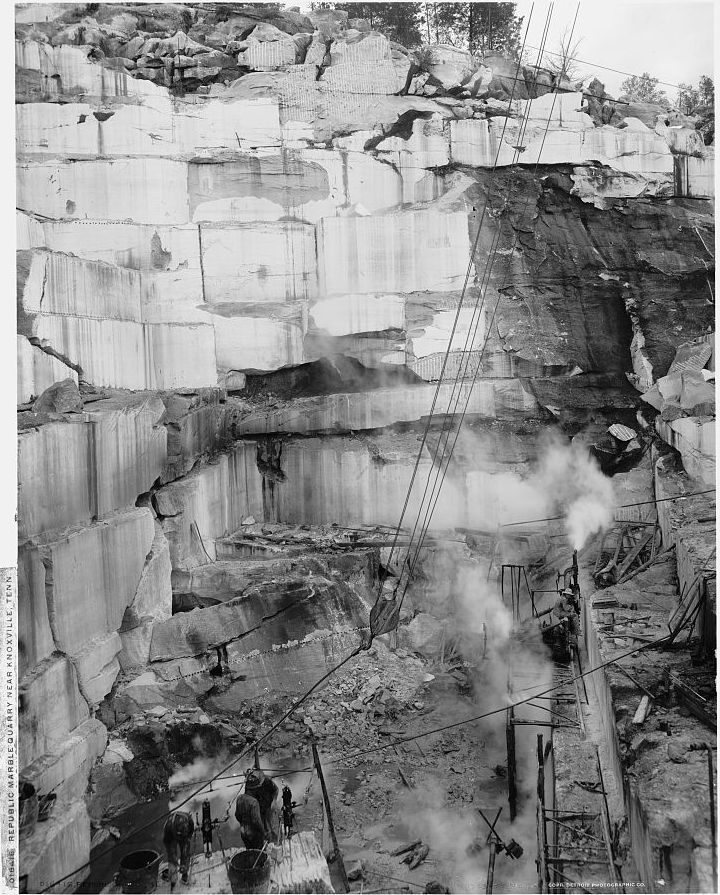
Early-1900s photograph of the Republic Marble Quarry near Knoxville

After the war, northern investors such as brothers Joseph and David Richards helped Knoxville recover relatively quickly. The Richards brothers convinced 104 Welsh immigrant families to migrate from the Welsh Tract in Pennsylvania to work in a rolling mill. These Welsh families settled in an area now known as Mechanicsville. The Richards brothers also co-founded the Knoxville Iron Works beside the L&N Railroad, also employing Welsh workers. Later, the site was used as the grounds for the 1982 World's Fair.

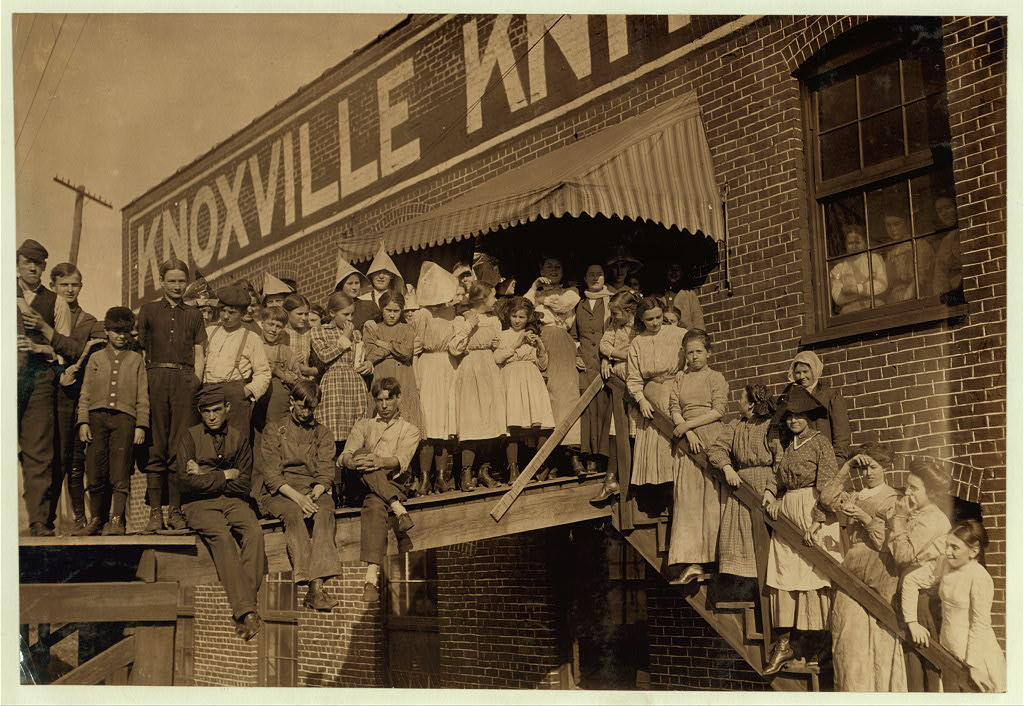
Child labor at Knoxville Knitting Works, photographed by Lewis Wickes Hine in 1910

Other companies that sprang up during this period were Knoxville Woolen Mills, Dixie Cement, and Woodruff's Furniture. Between 1880 and 1887, 97 factories were established in Knoxville, most of them specializing in textiles, food products, and iron products. By the 1890s, Knoxville was home to more than 50 wholesaling houses, making it the third largest wholesaling center by volume in the South. The Candoro Marble Works, established in the community of Vestal in 1914, became the nation's foremost producer of pink marble and one of the nation's largest marble importers. In 1896, Knoxville celebrated its achievements by creating its own flag. The Flag of Knoxville, Tennessee represents the city's progressive growth due to agriculture and industry.

In 1869, Thomas Humes, a Union sympathizer and president of East Tennessee University, secured federal post-war damage reimbursement and state-designated Morrill Act funding to expand the college, which had been occupied by both armies during the war. Charles Dabney, who became president of the university in 1887, overhauled the faculty and established a law school in an attempt to modernize the scope of the university. In 1879, the state changed its name to the University of Tennessee, at the request of the trustees, who hoped to secure more funding from the Tennessee state legislature.

The post-war manufacturing boom brought thousands of immigrants to the city. The population of Knoxville grew from around 5,300 in 1860 to 32,637 in 1900. West Knoxville was annexed in 1897, and over 5,000 new homes were built between 1895 and 1904. In 1901, train robber Kid Curry (whose real name was Harvey Logan), a member of Butch Cassidy's Wild Bunch was captured after shooting two deputies on Knoxville's Central Avenue. He escaped from the Knoxville jail and rode away on a horse stolen from the sheriff.

=== Progressive Era and the Great Depression ===
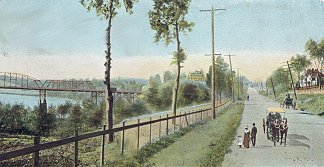
Kingston Pike, c. 1910, with the former Cherokee Bridge

Knoxville hosted the Appalachian Exposition in 1910 and 1911 and the National Conservation Exposition in 1913. The latter is sometimes credited with giving rise to the movement to create a national park in the Great Smoky Mountains, some 20 miles (32 km) south of Knoxville. Around this time, several affluent Knoxvillians began purchasing summer cottages in Elkmont and began to pursue the park idea more vigorously. They were led by Knoxville businessman Colonel David C. Chapman, who, as head of the Great Smoky Mountains Park Commission, was largely responsible for raising the funds for the purchase of the property that became the core of the park. The Great Smoky Mountains National Park opened in 1933.

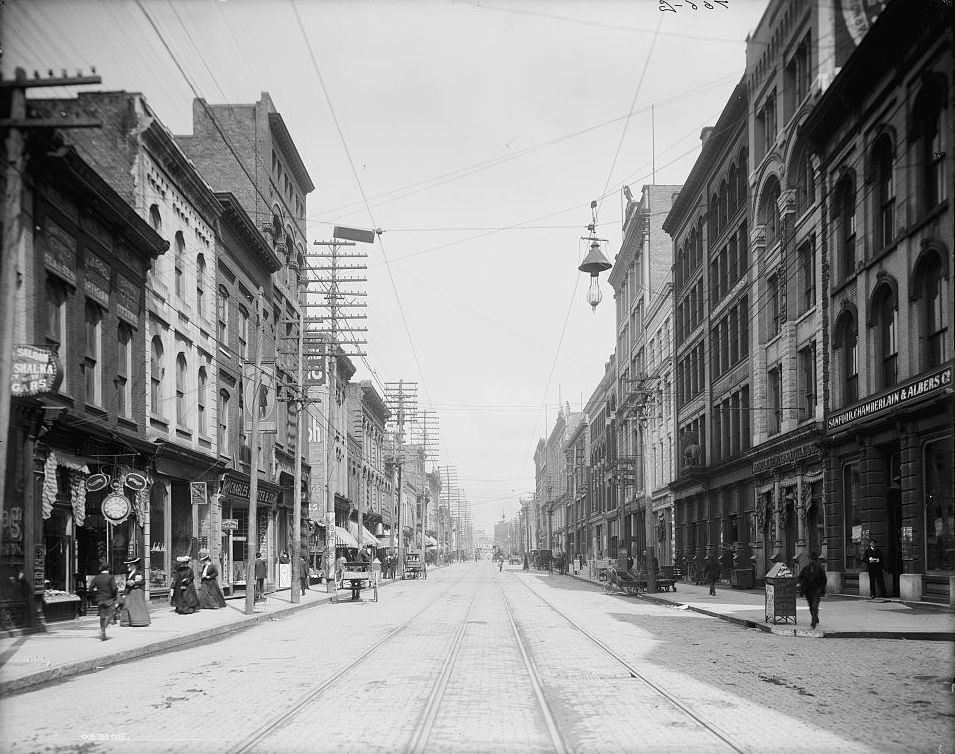
Gay Street in the early 1900s

Knoxville's reliance on a manufacturing economy left it particularly vulnerable to the effects of the Great Depression. The Tennessee Valley also suffered from frequent flooding, and millions of acres of farmland had been ruined by soil erosion. To control flooding and improve the economy in the Tennessee Valley, the federal government created the Tennessee Valley Authority (TVA) in 1933. Beginning with Norris Dam, TVA constructed a series of hydroelectric dams and other power plants throughout the valley over the next few decades, bringing flood control, jobs, and electricity to the region. The Federal Works Projects Administration, which also arrived in the 1930s, helped build McGhee Tyson Airport and expand Neyland Stadium. TVA's headquarters, which consists of twin high rises built in the 1970s, were among Knoxville's first modern high-rise buildings.

In 1947, John Gunther dubbed Knoxville the "ugliest city" in America in his best-selling book Inside U.S.A. Gunther's description jolted the city into enacting a series of beautification measures that helped improve the appearance of the downtown area.

=== 1982 World's Fair and 20th century ===
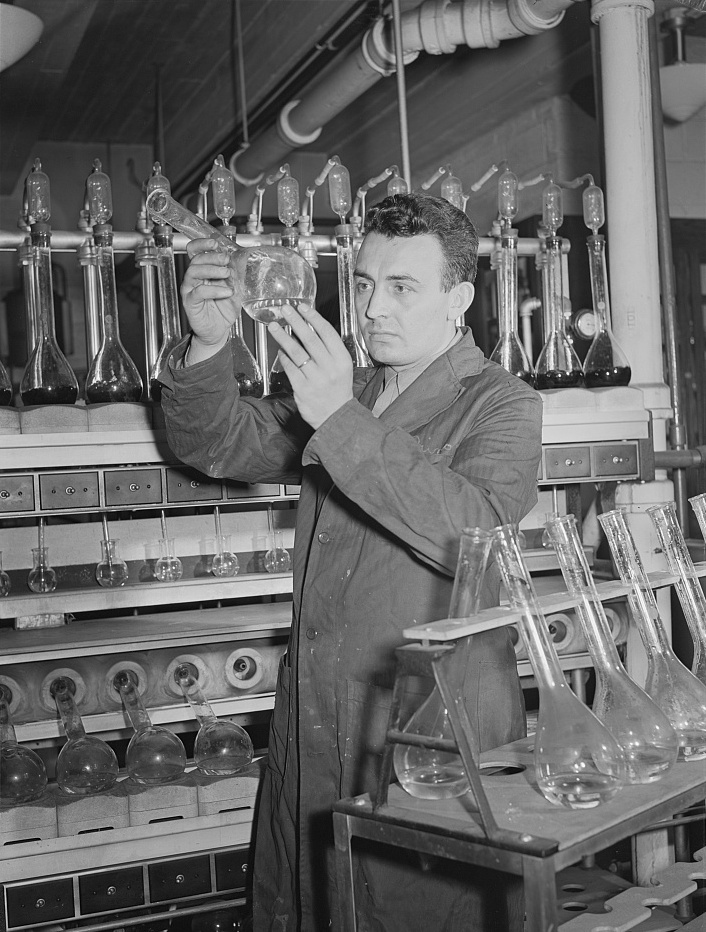
Research laboratory at U.T. in the early 1940s

Knoxville's textile and manufacturing industries largely fell victim to foreign competition in the 1950s and 1960s, and after the establishment of the Interstate Highway System in the 1960s, the railroad—which had been largely responsible for Knoxville's industrial growth—began to decline. The rise of suburban shopping malls in the 1970s drew retail revenues away from Knoxville's downtown area. While government jobs and economic diversification prevented widespread unemployment in Knoxville, the city sought to recover the massive loss of revenue by attempting to annex neighboring communities. Knoxville annexed the communities of Bearden and Fountain City, which were Knoxville's largest suburbs, in 1962. Knoxville officials attempted the annexation of the neighboring Farragut-Concord community in western Knox County, but the city failed following the incorporation of Farragut in 1980. These annexation attempts often turned combative, and several attempts to consolidate Knoxville and Knox County into a metro government failed, while school boards and the planning commissions would merge on July 1, 1987.

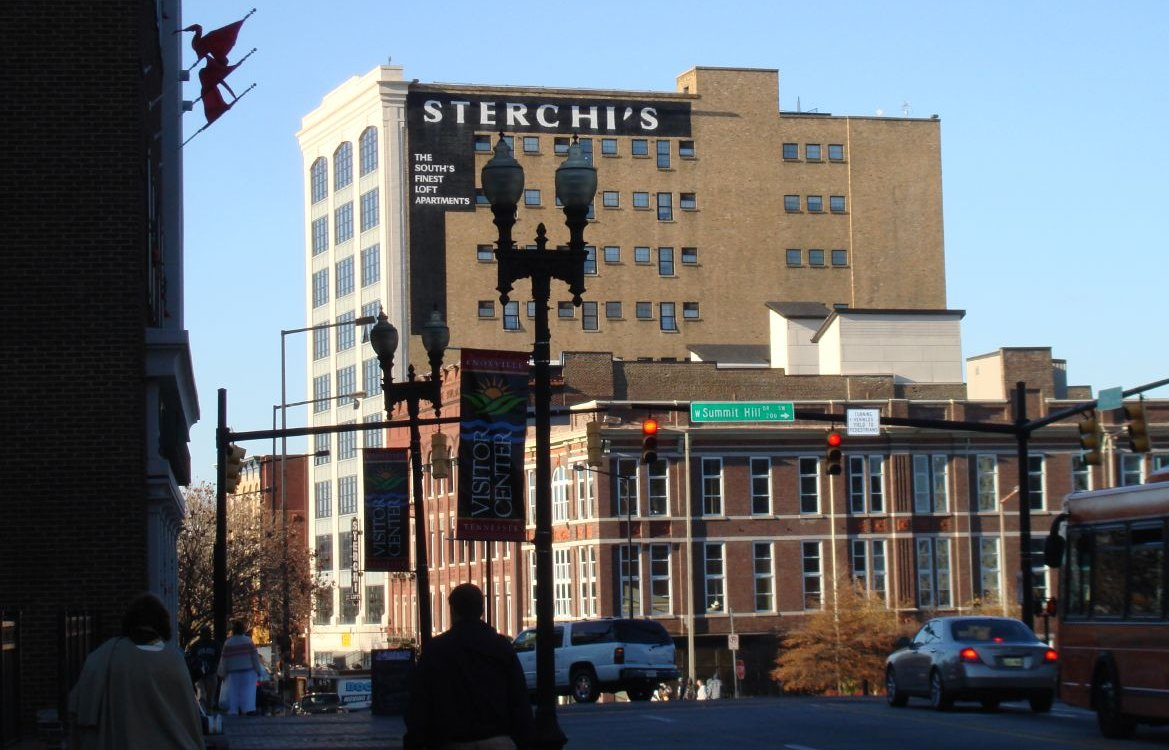
The Sterchi Lofts building, formerly Sterchi Brothers Furniture store, the most prominent building on Knoxville's "100 Block"

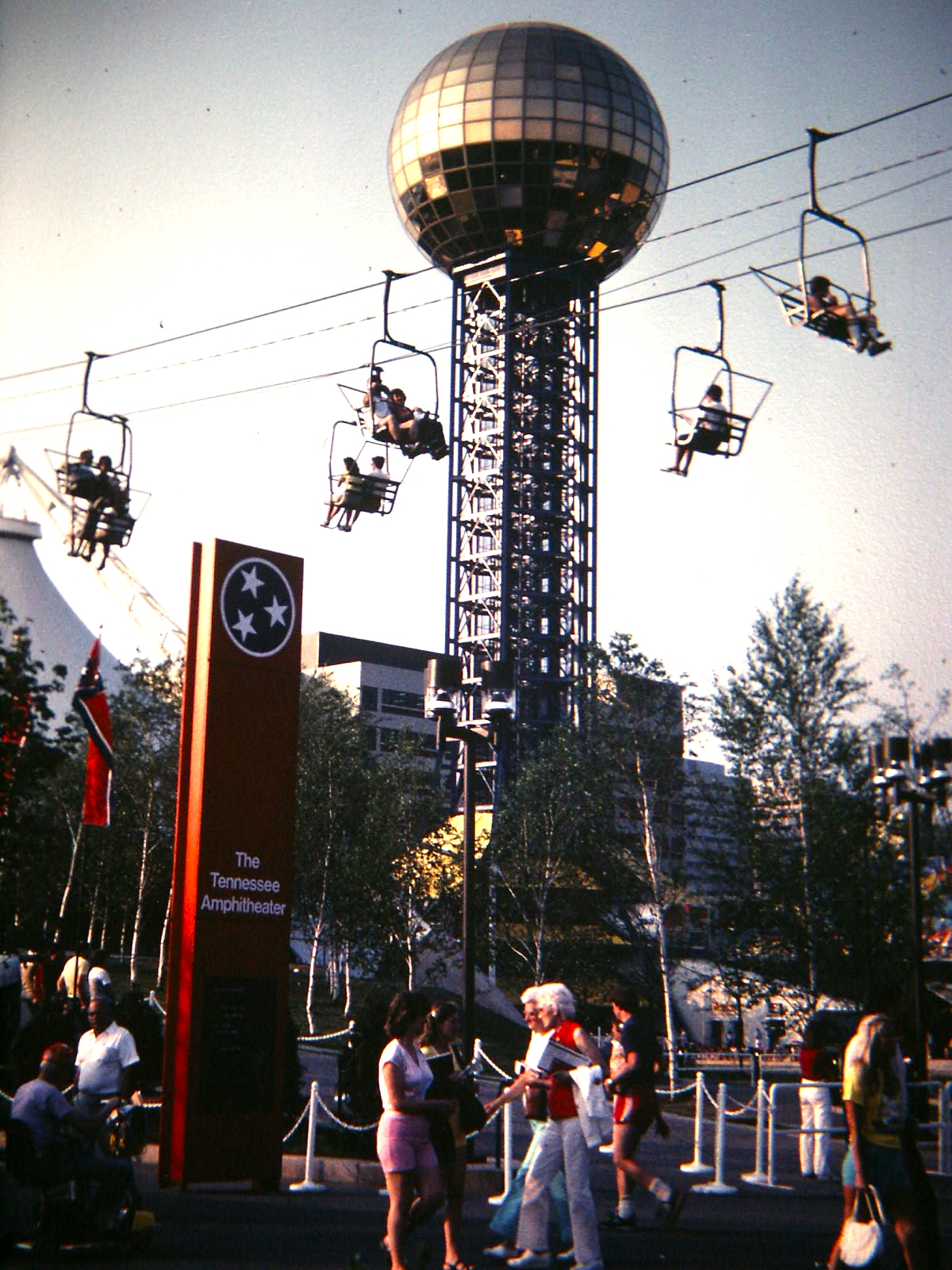
The Sunsphere, with riders aboard a nearby sky-lift during the 1982 World's Fair

With further annexation attempts stalling, Knoxville initiated several projects aimed at boosting revenue in its downtown area. The 1982 World's Fair—the most successful of these projects, with eleven million visitors—became one of the most popular expositions in U.S. history. The Rubik's Cube made its debut at this event. The fair's energy theme was selected because Knoxville was home to TVA's headquarters and for its proximity to Oak Ridge National Laboratory. The Sunsphere, a 266-foot (81 m) steel truss structure topped with a gold-colored glass sphere, was built for the fair and remains one of Knoxville's most prominent structures, along with the adjacent Tennessee Amphitheater.

During the 1980s and into the 1990s, the city would see one of its largest expansions of its city limits, with a reported 26 square miles of "shoestring annexation" under the administration of Mayor Victor Ashe. Ashe's efforts were controversial, largely consisting of annexation of interstate right-of-ways, highway-oriented commercial clusters, and residential subdivisions to increase tax revenue for the city. Residents voiced opposition, citing claims of urban sprawl and government overreach.

=== 21st century and economic renaissance ===
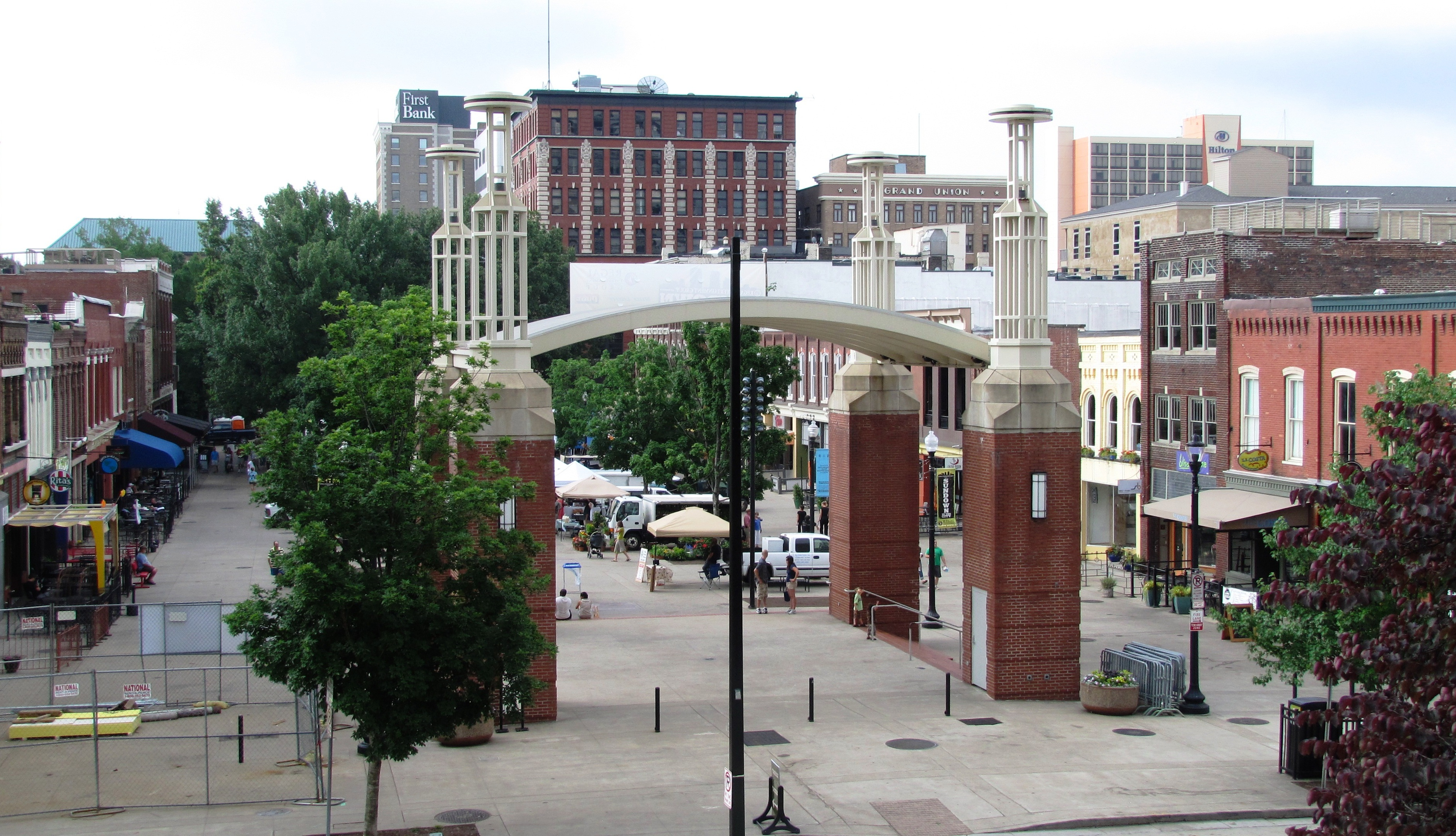
The north end of the Market Square in Knoxville, Tennessee, USA, viewed from the TVA towers courtyard. The square's stage dominates the view at the center. The seven-story Arnstein Building rises top-center.

Knoxville's downtown has been developing, with the opening of the Women's Basketball Hall of Fame and the Knoxville Convention Center, the redevelopment of Market Square, a new visitors center, a regional history museum, a Regal Cinemas theater, several restaurants and bars, and many new and redeveloped condominiums. Since 2000, Knoxville has successfully brought business back to the downtown area. The arts in particular have begun to flourish; there are multiple venues for outdoor concerts, and Gay Street hosts a new arts annex and gallery surrounded by many studios and new businesses as well. The Bijou and Tennessee Theatres underwent renovation, providing an initiative for the city and its developers to re-purpose the old downtown.

Development has also expanded across the Tennessee River on the South Knoxville waterfront. In 2006, the city adopted the South Waterfront Vision Plan, a long-term improvement project to revitalize the 750-acre waterfront fronting three miles of shoreline on the Tennessee River. The project's primary focus is the commercial and residential development over a 20-year timeline. Knoxville Baptist Hospital, located on the waterfront, was demolished in 2016 to make room for a mixed-use project called One Riverwalk. The development consisted of three office buildings, including a headquarters for Regal Entertainment Group, a hotel, student housing, and 300 multi-family residential units.

In June 2020, the Knoxville City Council announced the investment of over $5.5 million in federal and local funds towards the development of a business park along the Interstate 275 corridor in North Knoxville. The project was first proposed by a study prepared Knoxville-Knox County Metropolitan Planning Commission in 2007. In August 2020, UT President and Tennessee Smokies owner Randy Boyd announced plans of a mixed-use baseball stadium complex in the Old City neighborhood.

== Geography ==
=== Topography ===
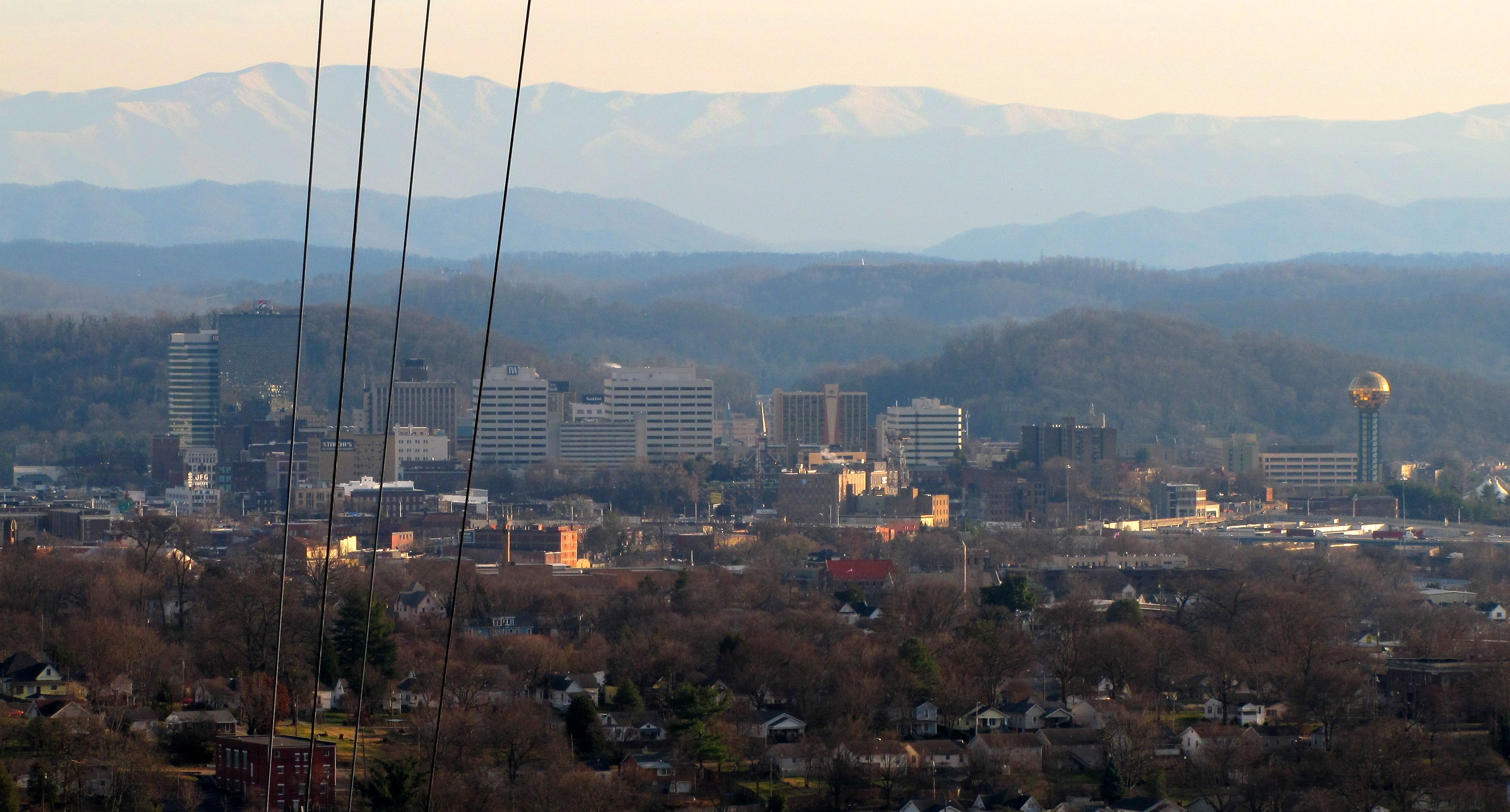
Downtown Knoxville, with the Great Smoky Mountains rising in the distance, viewed from Sharp's Ridge

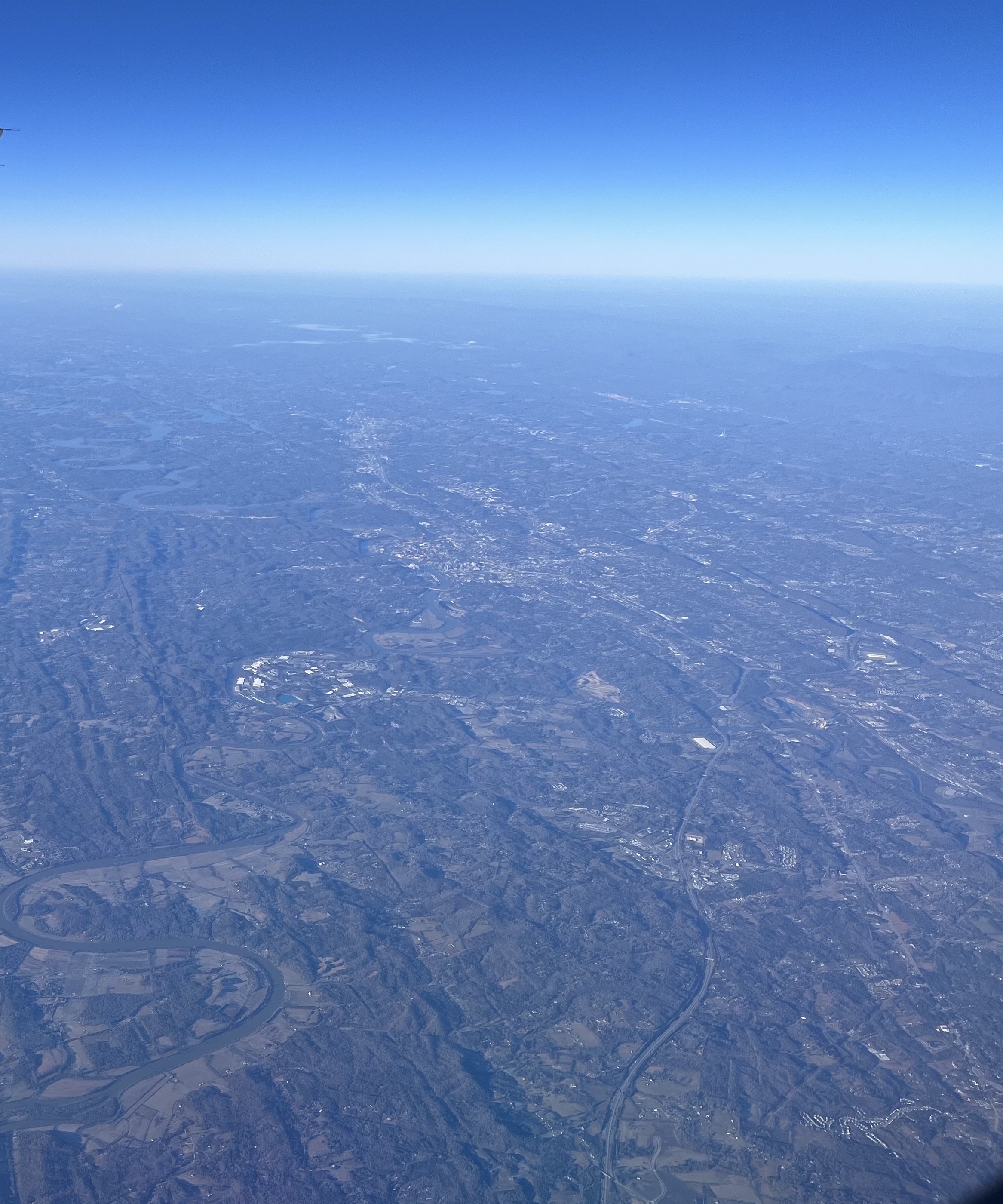
Aerial view from the east in 2024, showing the Tennessee River and Interstate 40 approaching the city

According to the United States Census Bureau, the city has a total area of 104.2 square miles (269.8 km^{2}), of which 98.5 square miles (255.2 km^{2}) is land and 5.6 square miles (14.6 km^{2}), or 5.42%, is water. Elevations range from just over 800 feet (240 m) along the riverfront to just over 1,000 feet (300 m) on various hilltops in West Knoxville, with the downtown area setting at just over 900 feet (270 m). High points include Sharp's Ridge in North Knoxville at 1,391 feet (424 m) and Brown Mountain in South Knoxville at 1,260 feet (380 m).

Knoxville is situated in the Great Appalachian Valley (known locally as the Tennessee Valley), about halfway between the Great Smoky Mountains to the east and the Cumberland Plateau to the west. The Great Valley is part of a sub-range of the Appalachian Mountains known as the Ridge-and-Valley Appalachians, which is characterized by long narrow ridges flanked by broad valleys. Prominent Ridge-and-Valley structures in the Knoxville area include Sharp's Ridge and Beaver Ridge in the northern part of the city, Brown Mountain in South Knoxville, parts of Bays Mountain just south of the city, and parts of McAnnally Ridge in the northeastern part of the city.

The Tennessee River, which passes through the downtown area, is formed in southeastern Knoxville at the confluence of the Holston River, which flows southwest from Virginia, and the French Broad River, which flows west from North Carolina. The section of the Tennessee River that passes through Knoxville is part of Fort Loudoun Lake, an artificial reservoir created by TVA's Fort Loudoun Dam about 30 miles (48 km) downstream in Lenoir City. Notable tributaries of the Tennessee in Knoxville include First Creek and Second Creek, which flow through the downtown area, Third Creek, which flows west of U.T., and Sinking Creek, Ten Mile Creek, and Turkey Creek, which drain West Knoxville.

=== Climate ===
Knoxville falls in the humid subtropical climate (Köppen: Cfa) zone. Summers are hot and humid, with the daily average temperature in July at 78.4 °F (25.8 °C), and an average of 36 days per year with temperatures reaching 90 °F (32 °C). Winters are generally much cooler and less stable, with occasional small amounts of snow. January has a daily average temperature of 38.2 °F (3.4 °C), with an average of 5 days where the high remains at or below freezing. (Note: In 1915, 1921, 1990, and 2013, no day the entire year remained at or below freezing.) The record high for Knoxville is 105 °F (41 °C) on June 30 and July 1, 2012, while the record low is −24 °F (−31 °C) on January 21, 1985. Annual precipitation averages just under 52 in (1,320 mm), and normal seasonal snowfall is 4.6 in (12 cm). The one-day record for snowfall is 17.5 in (44 cm), which occurred on February 13, 1960. (Note: This contributed to the winter of 1959−60 being the snowiest on record, with a total of 56.7 in (144 cm). On the other extreme, five winters, most recently 2007−08, have recorded only a trace of snowfall.)

Climate data for Knoxville (McGhee Tyson Airport), 1991−2020 normals, (Note: Mean monthly maxima and minima (i.e. the expected highest and lowest temperature readings at any point during the year or given month) calculated based on data at said location from 1991 to 2020.) extremes 1871–present (Note: Official records for Knoxville kept January 1871 to February 1942 at downtown and at McGhee Tyson Airport since March 1942. For more information, see Threadex)
Month	Jan	Feb	Mar	Apr	May	Jun	Jul	Aug	Sep	Oct	Nov	Dec	Year
Record high °F (°C)	77 (25)	83 (28)	88 (31)	93 (34)	96 (36)	105 (41)	105 (41)	102 (39)	103 (39)	96 (36)	85 (29)	80 (27)	105 (41)
Mean maximum °F (°C)	68.1 (20.1)	71.7 (22.1)	78.4 (25.8)	84.5 (29.2)	89.0 (31.7)	93.1 (33.9)	95.1 (35.1)	94.0 (34.4)	91.6 (33.1)	84.0 (28.9)	75.8 (24.3)	69.1 (20.6)	96.0 (35.6)
Mean daily maximum °F (°C)	48.2 (9.0)	52.8 (11.6)	61.4 (16.3)	71.2 (21.8)	78.9 (26.1)	85.7 (29.8)	88.4 (31.3)	87.8 (31.0)	82.5 (28.1)	71.7 (22.1)	60.0 (15.6)	51.0 (10.6)	70.0 (21.1)
Daily mean °F (°C)	39.1 (3.9)	42.9 (6.1)	50.6 (10.3)	59.6 (15.3)	67.9 (19.9)	75.3 (24.1)	78.5 (25.8)	77.6 (25.3)	71.8 (22.1)	60.3 (15.7)	49.0 (9.4)	41.9 (5.5)	59.5 (15.3)
Mean daily minimum °F (°C)	30.0 (−1.1)	33.1 (0.6)	39.8 (4.3)	48.0 (8.9)	56.9 (13.8)	64.9 (18.3)	68.7 (20.4)	67.5 (19.7)	61.1 (16.2)	48.9 (9.4)	38.1 (3.4)	32.8 (0.4)	49.2 (9.6)
Mean minimum °F (°C)	11.6 (−11.3)	16.8 (−8.4)	22.6 (−5.2)	32.6 (0.3)	41.4 (5.2)	54.6 (12.6)	61.4 (16.3)	59.9 (15.5)	48.3 (9.1)	33.4 (0.8)	24.0 (−4.4)	18.0 (−7.8)	9.0 (−12.8)
Record low °F (°C)	−24 (−31)	−10 (−23)	1 (−17)	22 (−6)	32 (0)	42 (6)	49 (9)	49 (9)	35 (2)	24 (−4)	5 (−15)	−6 (−21)	−24 (−31)
Average precipitation inches (mm)	4.76 (121)	4.81 (122)	4.89 (124)	4.71 (120)	4.13 (105)	4.24 (108)	5.25 (133)	3.63 (92)	3.49 (89)	2.81 (71)	4.21 (107)	5.00 (127)	51.93 (1,319)
Average snowfall inches (cm)	1.7 (4.3)	1.4 (3.6)	0.9 (2.3)	0.0 (0.0)	0.0 (0.0)	0.0 (0.0)	0.0 (0.0)	0.0 (0.0)	0.0 (0.0)	0.0 (0.0)	0.1 (0.25)	0.5 (1.3)	4.6 (12)
Average precipitation days (≥ 0.01 in)	11.5	11.7	12.7	11.1	11.1	12.0	11.6	9.8	7.8	8.0	9.4	12.0	128.7
Average snowy days (≥ 0.1 in)	1.2	1.3	0.7	0.0	0.0	0.0	0.0	0.0	0.0	0.0	0.2	0.6	4.0
Average relative humidity (%)	71.7	68.0	64.8	63.3	70.8	73.5	75.7	76.3	76.1	73.0	71.8	72.9	71.5
Mean monthly sunshine hours	135.8	145.3	208.9	256.6	287.2	291.1	287.3	278.0	232.3	217.2	151.7	122.5	2,613.9
Percentage possible sunshine	44	48	56	65	66	67	65	67	62	62	49	40	59
Source: NOAA (relative humidity and sun 1961–1990)

=== Metropolitan area ===
Knoxville is the central city in the Knoxville metropolitan area, an Office of Management and Budget (OMB) designated metropolitan statistical area (MSA) that covers Knox, Anderson, Blount, Campbell, Grainger, Loudon, Morgan, Roane and Union counties. Researchers have mapped the Knoxville Metropolitan area as one of the 18 major cities in the Piedmont Atlantic megaregion. The population of the Knoxville metropolitan area was 903,300 at the 2020 census and estimated to have grown to 957,608 by 2024.

The Knoxville MSA is the chief component of the OMB-designated larger Knoxville–Morristown–Sevierville combined statistical area. The CSA also includes the Morristown metropolitan area (Hamblen and Jefferson counties) and the Sevierville (Sevier County) and Newport (Cocke County) micropolitan statistical areas. The combined population of the CSA in 2020 was 1.16 million.

=== Neighborhoods ===
Knoxville is roughly divided into the Downtown area and sections based on the four cardinal directions: North Knoxville, South Knoxville, East Knoxville, and West Knoxville. Downtown Knoxville traditionally consists of the area bounded by the river on the south, First Creek on the east, Second Creek on the west, and the railroad tracks on the north, though the definition has expanded to include the U.T. campus and Fort Sanders neighborhood, and several neighborhoods along or just off Broadway south of Sharp's Ridge ("Downtown North"). While primarily home to the city's central business district and municipal offices, the Old City and Gay Street are mixed residential and commercial areas.

South Knoxville consists of the parts of the city located south of the river and includes the neighborhoods of Vestal, Lindbergh Forest, Island Home Park, Colonial Hills, and Old Sevier. This area contains major commercial corridors along Chapman Highway and Alcoa Highway.

West Knoxville generally consists of the areas west of U.T. and includes the suburban neighborhoods of Sequoyah Hills, West Hills, Bearden, Cumberland Estates, Westmoreland, Suburban Hills, Cedar Bluff, Rocky Hill, and Ebenezer. This area, concentrated largely around Kingston Pike, is home to thriving retail centers such as West Town Mall and Turkey Creek.

East Knoxville consists of the areas east of First Creek and the James White Parkway and includes the neighborhoods of Parkridge, Burlington, Morningside, and Five Points. This area, concentrated along Magnolia Avenue, is home to Chilhowee Park and Zoo Knoxville.

North Knoxville consists of the areas north of Sharp's Ridge, namely the Fountain City and Inskip-Norwood areas. This area's major commercial corridor is located along Broadway.

==== List of notable neighborhoods ====
- Bearden
- Cedar Bluff
- Chilhowee Park
- Colonial Village
- Cumberland Estates
- Downtown
- Emory Place
- Fort Sanders
- Fountain City
  - Oakland (former)
- Fourth & Gill
- Hardin Valley
- Island Home Park
- Lindbergh Forest
- Lonsdale
- Mechanicsville
- North Hills
- Oakwood-Lincoln Park
- Old City
- Old North Knoxville
- Parkridge
- Rocky Hill
- Sequoyah Hills
- South Knoxville
- West Hills

== Demographics ==
Historical population
Census	Pop.	Note	%±
1800	387		—
1810	730		88.6%
1820	1,115		52.7%
1830	1,500		34.5%
1840	1,830		22.0%
1850	2,076		13.4%
1860	5,300		155.3%
1870	8,682		63.8%
1880	9,693		11.6%
1890	22,535		132.5%
1900	32,637		44.8%
1910	36,346		11.4%
1920	77,818		114.1%
1930	105,802		36.0%
1940	111,580		5.5%
1950	124,769		11.8%
1960	111,827		−10.4%
1970	174,587		56.1%
1980	175,045		0.3%
1990	165,121		−5.7%
2000	173,890		5.3%
2010	178,874		2.9%
2020	190,740		6.6%
2025 (est.)	202,021	▲	5.9%

=== Racial and ethnic composition ===
Knoxville, Tennessee – Racial and ethnic composition Note: the US Census treats Hispanic/Latino as an ethnic category. This table excludes Latinos from the racial categories and assigns them to a separate category. Hispanics/Latinos may be of any race.
Race / Ethnicity (NH = Non-Hispanic)	Pop 2000	Pop 2010	Pop 2020	% 2000	% 2010	% 2020
White alone (NH)	137,336	132,641	130,036	78.98%	74.15%	68.17%
Black or African American alone (NH)	28,015	30,257	30,123	16.11%	16.92%	15.79%
Native American or Alaska Native alone (NH)	504	496	547	0.29%	0.28%	0.29%
Asian alone (NH)	2,516	2,875	4,323	1.45%	1.61%	2.27%
Native Hawaiian or Pacific Islander alone (NH)	45	198	105	0.03%	0.11%	0.06%
Other race alone (NH)	276	315	830	0.16%	0.18%	0.44%
Mixed race or Multiracial (NH)	2,447	3,886	9,616	1.41%	2.17%	5.04%
Hispanic or Latino (any race)	2,751	8,206	15,160	1.58%	4.59%	7.95%
Total	173,890	178,874	190,740	100.00%	100.00%	100.00%

=== 2020 census ===
As of the 2020 census, Knoxville had a population of 190,740 residents in 82,857 households and 41,073 families. The median age was 33.3 years, with 18.7% under the age of 18 and 14.5% aged 65 or older; 16.5% were between 18 and 24, 29.0% were 25 to 44, and 21.3% were 45 to 64. For every 100 females there were 92.4 males, and for every 100 females age 18 and over there were 90.2 males age 18 and over.

99.9% of residents lived in urban areas, while 0.1% lived in rural areas.

There were 82,857 households in Knoxville, of which 23.0% had children under the age of 18 living in them. Of all households, 30.6% were married-couple households, 25.0% were households with a male householder and no spouse or partner present, and 36.1% were households with a female householder and no spouse or partner present. About 38.6% of all households were made up of individuals and 11.8% had someone living alone who was 65 years of age or older.

There were 91,908 dwelling units, of which 9.8% were vacant. The homeowner vacancy rate was 2.2% and the rental vacancy rate was 8.6%.

The 2020 census reported a population density of 1,932.1 per square mile (746.0/km^{2}) and 91,908 housing units at an average density of 931.0 per square mile (359.5/km^{2}).

Racial composition as of the 2020 census
Race	Number	Percent
White	132,786	69.6%
Black or African American	30,477	16.0%
American Indian and Alaska Native	1,252	0.7%
Asian	4,365	2.3%
Native Hawaiian and Other Pacific Islander	114	0.1%
Some other race	7,904	4.1%
Two or more races	13,842	7.3%

=== American Community Survey (2016–2020) ===
The 2016–2020 American Community Survey 5-year estimates show that the average household size was 2.2 and the average family size was 3.0, and that 23.6% of residents 25 and older had earned a bachelor's degree or higher.

The same ACS estimates place the median household income at $41,598 (± $1,071) and the median family income at $55,835 (± $1,423); males had a median income of $29,741 (± $1,153) versus $24,105 (± $1,370) for females, and the median income for those 16 years old and over was $26,589 (± $591). Approximately 15.9% of families and 22.5% of the population were below the poverty line, including 30.1% of those under the age of 18 and 12.5% of those ages 65 or over.

=== 2010 census ===
As of the census of 2010, the population of Knoxville was 178,874, a 2.9% increase from 2000. The median age was 32.7, with 19.1% of the population under the age of 18, and 12.6% over the age of 65. The population was 48% male and 52% female. The population density was 1,815 persons per square mile.

The racial and ethnic composition of the city was 76.1% white, 17.1% black, 0.4% Native American, 1.6% Asian, and 0.2% Pacific Islander. Hispanic or Latino of any race were 4.6% of the population. People reporting more than one race formed 2.5% of the population.

Data collected by the Census from 2005 to 2009 reported 83,151 households in Knoxville, with an average of 2.07 persons per household. The home ownership rate was 51%, and 74.7% of residents had been living in the same house for more than one year. The median household income was $32,609, and the per capita income was $21,528. High school graduates were 83.8% of persons 25 and older, and 28.3% had earned a bachelor's degree or higher. The city's poverty rate was 25%, compared with 16.1% in Tennessee and 15.1% nationwide.

According to the opinion of the Economic Research Institute in a 2006 study, Knoxville was identified as the most affordable U.S. city for new college graduates, based on the ratio of typical salary to cost of living.

== Economy ==
In 2011, 15.9% of the Knoxville MSA work force was employed by government entities, while 14.1% were employed in the professional service sector, 14% worked in education or health care, 12.7% were employed in the retail sector, 10.5% worked in leisure and hospitality, and 8.9% worked in the manufacturing sector. The region had an unemployment rate of 7.9% in 2011. In the 2010 ACCRA Cost of Living Index was rated 89.6 (the national average was 100). In 2007, there were over 19,000 registered businesses in Knoxville. The city's businesses are served by the 2,100-member Knoxville Area Chamber Partnership. The Knoxville Chamber is one of six partners in the Knoxville-Oak Ridge Innovation Valley, which promotes economic development in Knox and surrounding counties.

=== Major corporations ===
The TVA, the nation's largest public power provider, reported $10.5 billion in revenue in 2021 and employs over 12,000 region-wide. The largest company based in Knoxville is privately held Pilot Flying J, the nation's largest truck stop chain and sixth-largest private company, which reported over $29.23 billion in revenue in 2012. Knoxville is home to the nation's fourth-largest wholesale grocer, the H. T. Hackney Company, which reported $3.8 billion (~$5.17 billion in 2025) in revenue in 2012, and one of the nation's largest digital-centric advertising firms, Tombras Group, which reported $80 million in revenue in 2011.

Other notable privately held companies based in the city include Bush Brothers, Sea Ray (and its parent company Brunswick Boat Group), Thermocopy, Petro's Chili & Chips, EdFinancial, Kurgo, 21st Mortgage and AC Entertainment. Also based in Knoxville are movie theater chain Regal Cinemas, and health care-staffing firm TeamHealth.

=== Real estate ===
The Knoxville area is home to 596 office buildings which contain over 21 million square feet of office space. The city's largest office building in terms of office space is the City-County Building, which has over 537,000 square feet of office space. The First Tennessee Plaza and the Riverview Tower were the largest privately owned office buildings, with 469,672 square feet and 367,000 square feet, respectively. Knoxville's largest industrial park is the 1,460-acre (590 ha) Forks of the River Industrial Park in southeastern Knoxville. Other major industrial and business parks include the 800-acre (320 ha) EastBridge Industrial Park and Midway Business Park in eastern Knox County and the 271-acre (110 ha) WestBridge Industrial Park in western Knox County.

=== Finance ===
The largest bank operating in Knoxville in terms of local deposits is Memphis-based First Horizon Bank, with $2.6 billion (~$3.6 billion in 2025) in local deposits, representing about 16% of Knoxville's banking market. It is followed by Charlotte-based Truist Financial ($2.5 billion), Birmingham-based Regions Bank ($1.9 billion), and locally headquartered Home Federal Bank of Tennessee ($1.6 billion). Other banks with significant operations in the city include Bank of America, First Bank (based in Lexington, Tennessee), and locally owned Clayton Bank and Trust. Major brokerage firms with offices in Knoxville include Edward Jones, Morgan Stanley Smith Barney, Wells Fargo, and Merrill Lynch. As of 2011, Knox County's largest mortgage lender (by dollar volume) was Wells Fargo with over $300 million (13% of the local market), followed by Mortgage Investors Group, SunTrust, Regions, and Home Federal. Knoxville's largest accounting firm as of 2012 is Pershing Yoakley & Associates, with 49 local CPAs, followed by Coulter & Justus (44), and Pugh CPA's(43).

=== Manufacturing ===
Over 700 manufacturing establishments are scattered throughout the Knoxville area. Sea Ray Boats is the city's largest manufacturer, employing 760 at its southeast Knoxville complex in 2009. The city is home to several automobile parts operations, including ARC Automotive (air bag actuators) and a Key Safety Systems plant (seat belts and other restraints). Other major manufacturing operations include a Melaleaca plant (personal care products), a Coca-Cola bottling plant, and a Gerdau Ameristeel plant that produces steel rebar. Aircraft manufacturer Cirrus also has its main customer delivery center based in Knoxville, which deals with aircraft maintenance & repair, flight training, and design personalization. Major manufacturing operations in the Knoxville MSA are conducted at the Y-12 plant in Oak Ridge, the DENSO plant and the Clayton Homes manufacturing center (both in Maryville), and the ALCOA plants in Alcoa.

=== Retail ===
The Knoxville area is home to 182 shopping centers and factory outlets, and over 2,400 retail establishments. One regional mall (West Town Mall) is located within the city, and two others (Foothills Mall in Maryville and Oak Ridge City Center in Oak Ridge) are located within the Knoxville MSA. Knoxville retailers reported $6.47 billion in sales in 2007, with just over $35,000 of retail sales per capita.

Knoxville's primary retail corridor is located along Kingston Pike in West Knoxville. This area is home to West Town Mall, the 358-acre Turkey Creek complex (half is in Knoxville and half is Farragut), and over 30 shopping centers. Downtown Knoxville contains a number of specialty shops, clubs, and dining areas, mostly concentrated in the Old City, Market Square, and along Gay Street. Other significant retail areas are located along Cumberland Avenue on the U.T. campus (mostly restaurants), Broadway in the vicinity of Fountain City, and Chapman Highway in South Knoxville.

=== Technology and research ===
The University of Tennessee is classified by the Carnegie Commission as a university with "very high research activity", conducting more than $300 million in externally funded research annually. U.T.-connected research centers with multimillion-dollar National Science Foundation grants include the Appalachian Collaborative Center for Learning, Assessment and Instruction in Mathematics, the National Institute for Computational Sciences, the National Institute for Mathematical and Biological Synthesis, and the Center for Ultra-wide-area Resilient Electric Energy Transmission Networks (CURENT). U.T. and the nearby Oak Ridge National Laboratory jointly conduct numerous research projects and co-manage the National Transportation Research Center.

The Tennessee Technology Corridor stretches across 7,000 acres (2,800 ha) between West Knoxville and Oak Ridge. The Corridor is home to 13 research and development firms employing nearly 2,000.

== Arts and culture ==
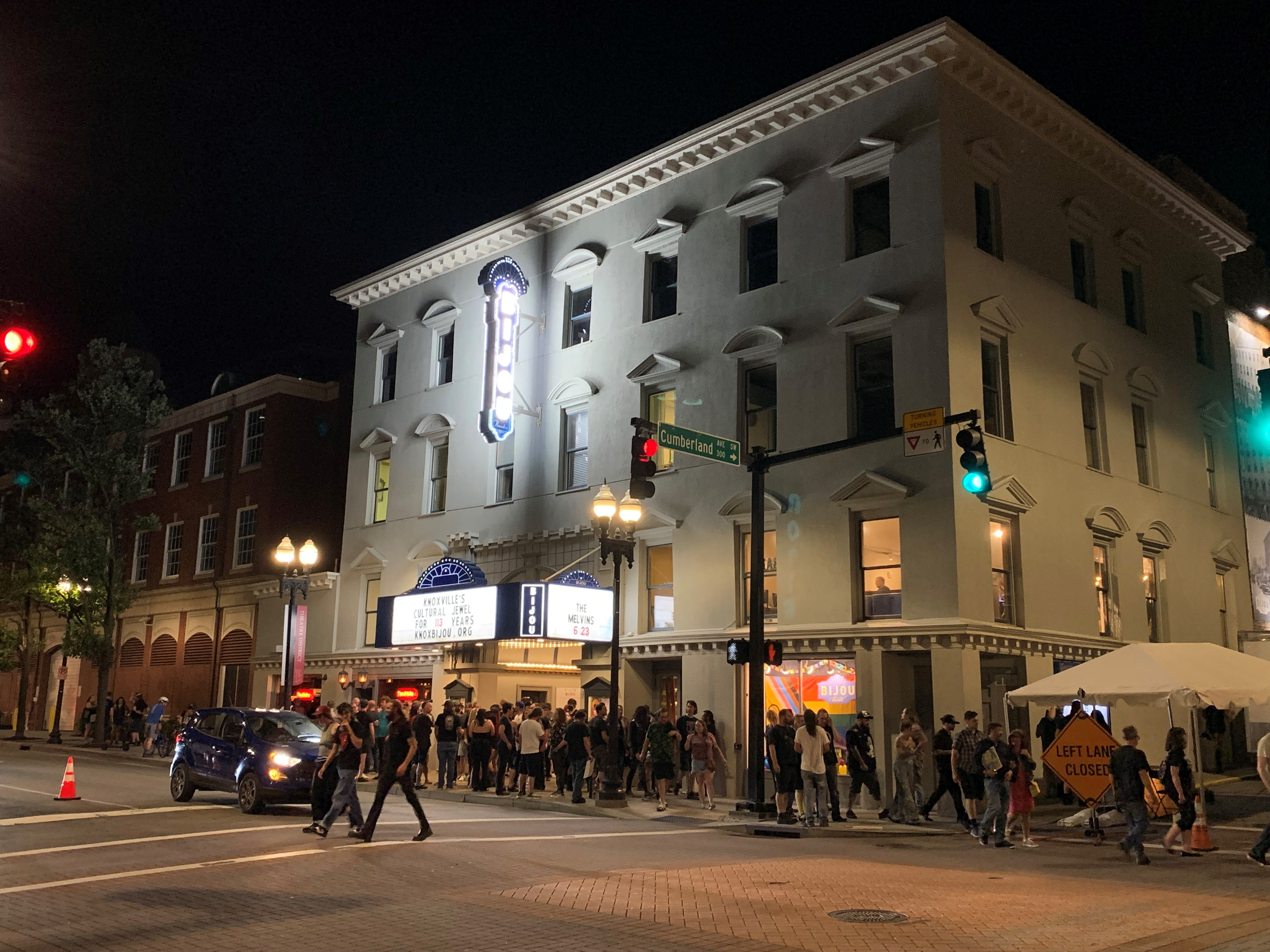
Concertgoers exiting the Bijou Theatre following a Melvins concert, circa June 2022

Knoxville is home to a rich arts community and has many festivals throughout the year. Its contributions to old-time, bluegrass and country music are numerous, from Flatt and Scruggs and Homer and Jethro to The Everly Brothers.

The Knoxville Symphony Orchestra (KSO), established in 1935, is the oldest continuing orchestra in the southeast. The KSO maintains a core of full-time professional musicians and performs at more than 200 events per year. Its traditional venues include the Tennessee Theatre, the Bijou Theatre, and the Civic Auditorium, though it also performs at several non-traditional venues. The Knoxville Opera performs a season of opera every year, accompanied by a chorus. Knoxville was the location of Sergei Rachmaninoff's final concert in 1943, performed at Alumni Memorial Auditorium at the University of Tennessee.

Knoxville's underground music scene is rooted with the promotion by AC Entertainment around 1979. AC Entertainment, a local entertainment group, sought to expand the city's scene. In the 1990s, noted alternative rock critic Ann Powers referred to the city as "Austin without the hype". Knoxville is home to a vibrant punk rock scene, having emerged from venues in the Old City district, specifically the Mill & Mine and Pilot Light venues. Such punk and hardcore bands include UXB, the STDs, and Koro. Knoxville hosts the Big Ears music festival since 2009. The festival, dubbed the "most ambitious avant-garde festival in America in more than a decade" in a 2014 Rolling Stone article, hosts musicians ranging from punk rock to chamber pop.

In literature, Southern Gothic author Cormac McCarthy is from Knoxville, and several of his books feature the city, such as Suttree, a 1979 semi-autobiographical novel. James Agee also lived in the city, and his 1957 posthumous autobiographical novel A Death in the Family provides a portrait of life in Knoxville, while also wrestling with the death of Agee's father in a car accident, and the impact this had on his family. Writer Alex Haley later moved to the city of Norris north of Knoxville, served as an advisor for city's committee preparing for the 1982 World's Fair and as an adjunct professor for the University of Tennessee. In the comic book industry, writers Lowell Cunningham and Walt Simonson are from the city.

The city also hosts numerous art festivals, including the 17-day Dogwood Arts Festival in April, which features art shows, crafts fairs, food and live music. Also in April is the Rossini Festival, which celebrates opera and Italian culture. June's Kuumba (meaning creativity in Swahili) Festival commemorates the region's African American heritage and showcases visual arts, folk arts, dance, games, music, storytelling, theater, and food.

=== Architecture ===
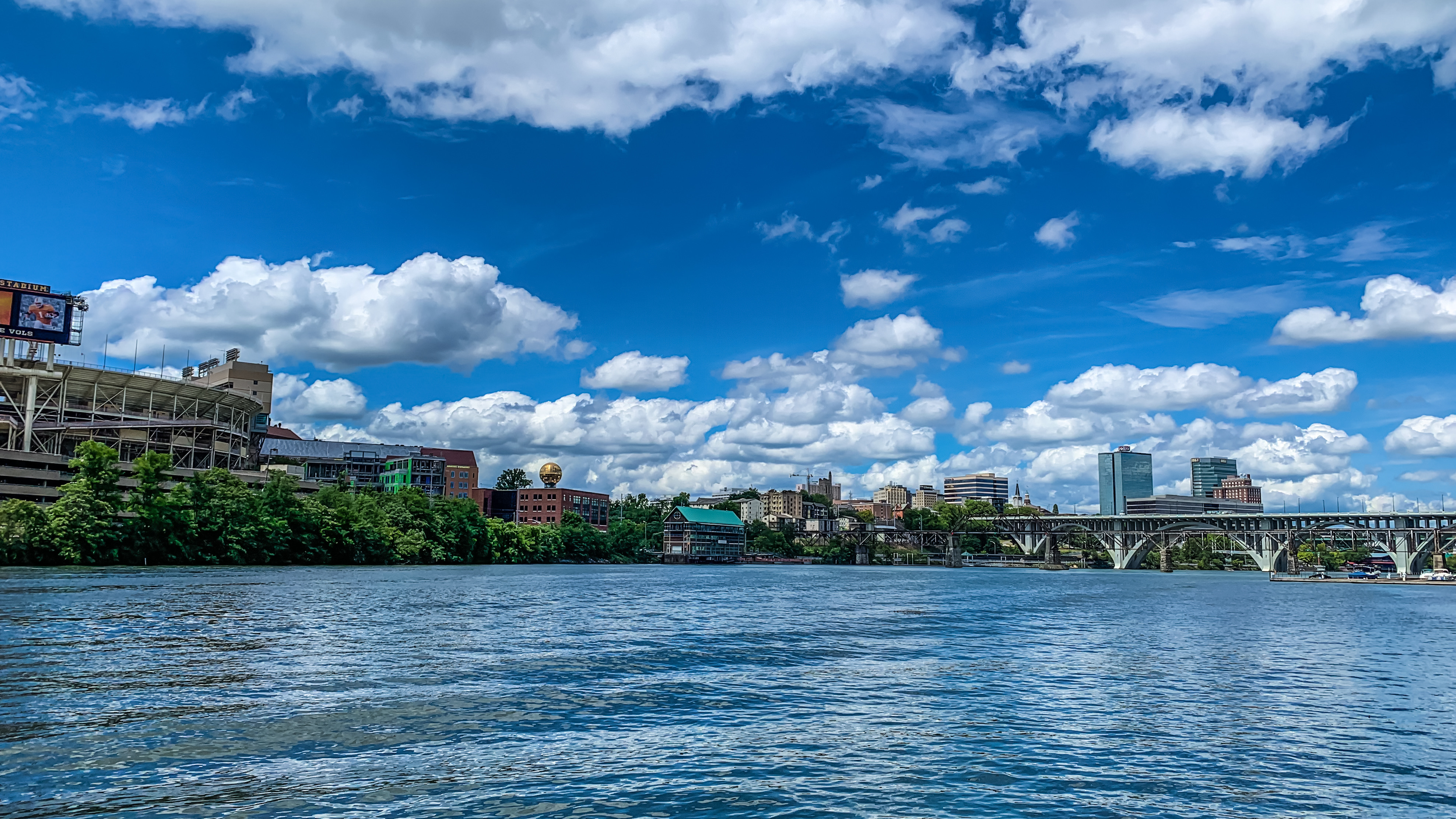
Skyline of Downtown Knoxville from the Tennessee River, 2020

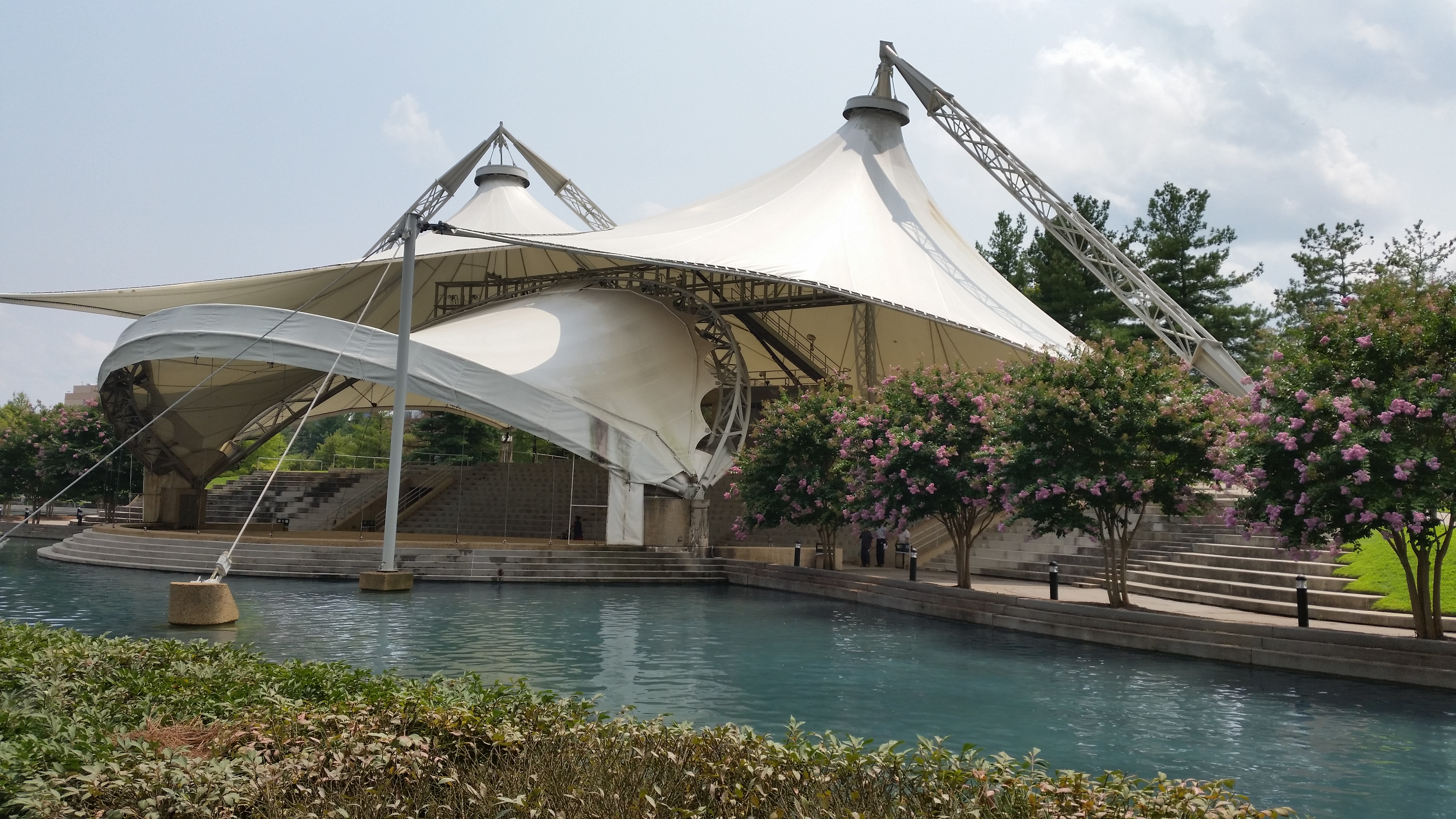
Tennessee Amphitheater in Knoxville, 2015

Knoxville's two tallest buildings are the 27-story First Tennessee Plaza and the 24-story Riverview Tower, both on Gay Street. Other prominent high-rises include the Tower at Morgan Hill, the Andrew Johnson Building, the Knoxville Hilton, the General Building, The Holston, the TVA Towers, and Sterchi Lofts. The most iconic structure is arguably the Sunsphere, a 266-foot (81 m) steel truss tower built for the 1982 World's Fair; it and the Tennessee Amphitheater are the only two structures that remain from that World's Fair.

The downtown area contains a mixture of architectural styles from various periods, ranging from the hewn-log James White House (1786) to the modern Knoxville Museum of Art (1990). Styles represented include Greek Revival (Old City Hall), Victorian (Hotel St. Oliver and Sullivan's Saloon), Gothic (Church Street Methodist Church and Ayres Hall), Neoclassical (First Baptist Church), and Art Deco (Knoxville Post Office). Gay Street, Market Square, and Jackson Avenue contain numerous examples of late-19th and early-20th century commercial architecture.

Residential architecture tends to reflect the city's development over two centuries. William Blount Mansion (1791), in the oldest part of the city, is designed in a vernacular Georgian style. "Streetcar suburbs" such as Fourth and Gill, Parkridge, and Fort Sanders, developed in the late 19th century with the advent of trolleys, tend to contain large concentrations of Victorian and bungalow/Craftsman-style houses popular during this period. Early automobile suburbs, such as Lindbergh Forest and Sequoyah Hills, contain late-1920s and 1930s styles such as Tudor Revival, English Cottage, and Mission Revival. Neighborhoods developed after World War II typically consist of Ranch-style houses.

Knoxville is home to the nation's largest concentration of homes designed by noted Victorian residential architect George Franklin Barber, who lived in the city. Other notable local architects include members of the Baumann family, Charles I. Barber (son of George), R. F. Graf, and more recently, Bruce McCarty. Nationally renowned architects with works still standing in the city include Alfred B. Mullett (Greystone), John Russell Pope (H.L. Dulin House), and Edward Larrabee Barnes (Knoxville Museum of Art).

=== Events ===
The Knoxville Christmas in the City event runs for eight weeks of events at locations throughout the city including the Singing Christmas Tree and ice skating on the Holidays on Ice skating rink.

- Asian Festival
- Big Ears Festival
- Boo At The Zoo
- Brewfest
- Concerts on the Square
- Dogwood Arts Festival
- Fantasy of Trees
- Festival on the Fourth
- First Friday ArtWalk
- Greek Fest
- HoLa Festival
- International Biscuit Festival
- Knox Food Fest
- Knoxville Hardcore Fest
- Knoxville Horror Film Festival
- Knoxville Marathon
- Knoxville Powerboat Classic
- Market Square Farmers' Market
- NSRA Street Rod Nationals South
- Rhythm & Blooms Festival
- Rossini Festival
- Tennessee Valley Fair
- Vestival
- Volapalooza

=== Sites of interest ===
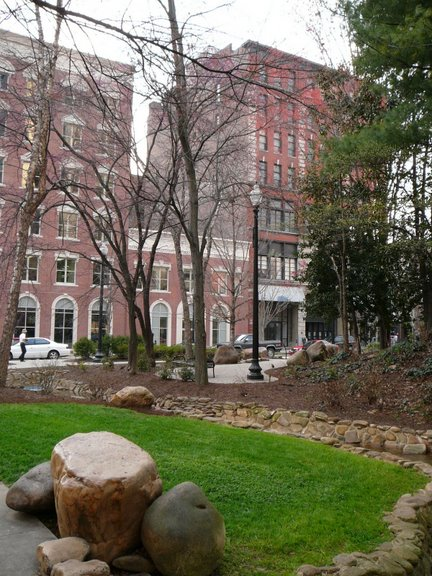
Krutch Park in Downtown Knoxville

- Beck Cultural Exchange Center
- Bijou Theatre
- Bleak House
- William Blount Mansion
- Fountain City Art Center
- Candoro Marble Works
- Civic Coliseum
- Fort Dickerson
- Haley Heritage Square
- Ijams Nature Center
- James White's Fort
- Knoxville Botanical Gardens and Arboretum
- Knoxville Convention Center
- Knoxville Greenways
- Knoxville Museum of Art
- Knoxville Police Museum
- Zoo Knoxville
- Mabry-Hazen House
- Marble Springs
- Market Square
- Frank H. McClung Museum
- Muse Knoxville
- Museum of East Tennessee History
- National Register of Historic Places, Knox County, Tennessee
- Old City
- Ramsey House
- Sunsphere
- Tennessee Amphitheater
- Tennessee River Boat
- Tennessee Theatre
- Three Rivers Rambler Train Ride
- Volunteer Landing
- Women's Basketball Hall of Fame
- World's Fair Park
- Knoxville's Urban Wilderness

=== Libraries ===
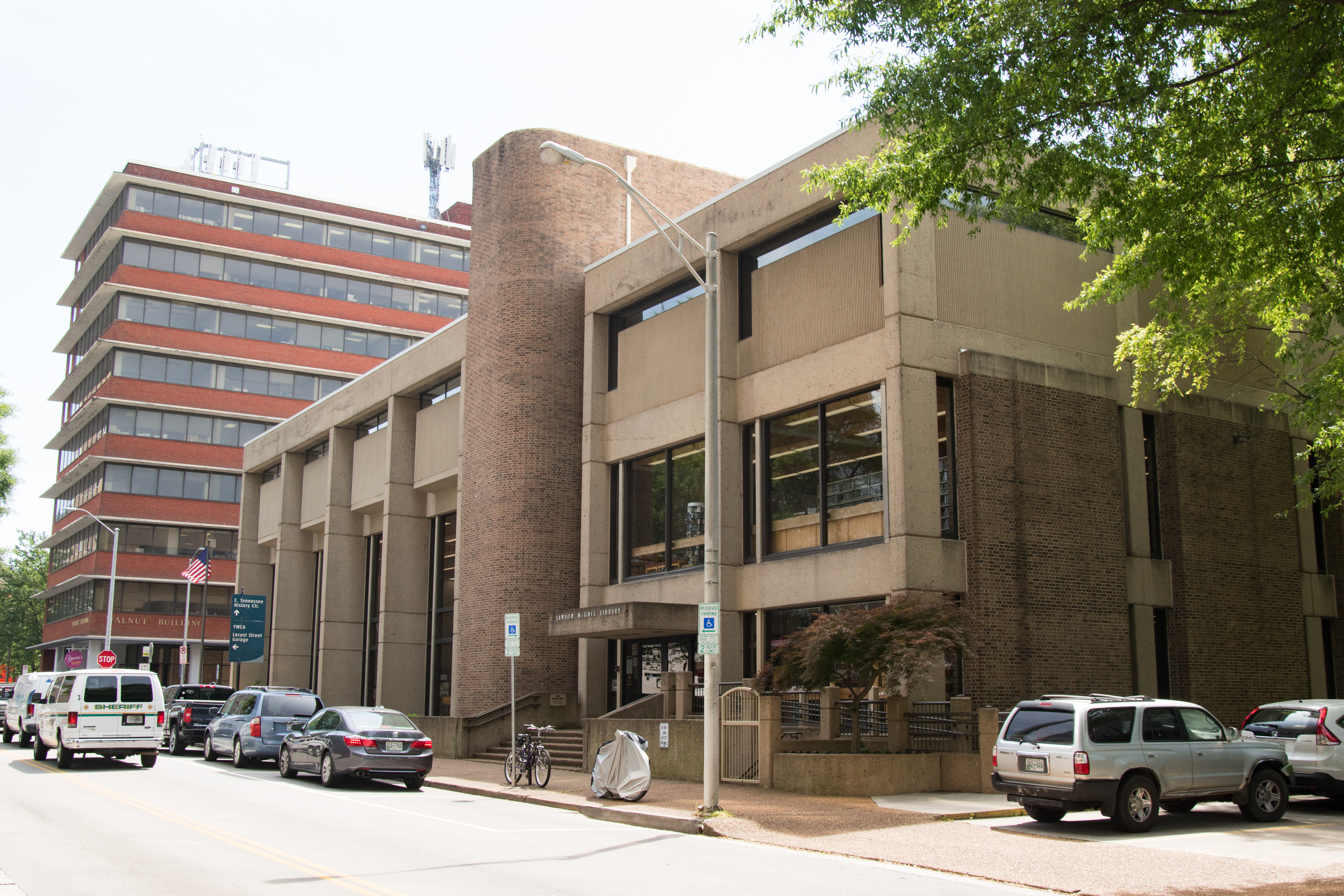
Lawson McGhee Library

The Knox County Public Library system consists of the Lawson McGhee Library, located downtown, and 17 branch libraries, overseeing a collection of over 1.3 million volumes.

== Sports ==
The University of Tennessee's athletics programs, nicknamed the "Volunteers", or "the Vols", are immensely popular. Neyland Stadium, where the Vols' football team plays, is one of the largest stadiums in the world seating 101,915, and Thompson–Boling Arena, home of the men's and women's basketball teams, is one of the nation's largest indoor basketball arenas. The telephone area code for Knox County and eight adjacent counties is 865 (VOL). Knoxville is also the home of the Women's Basketball Hall of Fame, almost entirely thanks to the success of Pat Summitt and the University of Tennessee women's basketball team.

Professional sports teams located in Knoxville include:

Team	Sport	League	Venue (Capacity)
Knoxville Ice Bears	Hockey	SPHL	Knoxville Civic Coliseum (6,500)
Knoxville Smokies	Baseball	Southern League (Double-A)	Covenant Health Park (6,355)
One Knoxville SC	Soccer	USL League One	Covenant Health Park (6,355)

== Government ==
Knoxville is governed by a mayor and nine-member City Council. It uses the strong-mayor form of the mayor-council system. The council consists of six members from single-member districts and three members elected at-large for the entire city. The council chooses from among its members the vice mayor (currently Lynne Fugate), the Beer Board chairperson (currently Debbie Helsley), and a representative to the Knoxville Transportation Authority (currently Matthew DeBardelaben). The City Council meets every other Tuesday at 7:00 p.m. in the Main Assembly Room of the City County Building.

The current mayor is Indya Kincannon, who was sworn in as the city's second female mayor on December 21, 2019, replacing the first female mayor of the city, Madeline Rogero, who was elected in 2011. Interim mayor Daniel Brown, the first African American to hold the office, was appointed in January 2011 following the resignation of Bill Haslam, who was elected Governor of Tennessee. Other recent mayors include Haslam's predecessor, Victor Ashe (1987−2003), Kyle Testerman (1972−1975, 1984−1987), and Randy Tyree (1976−1983).

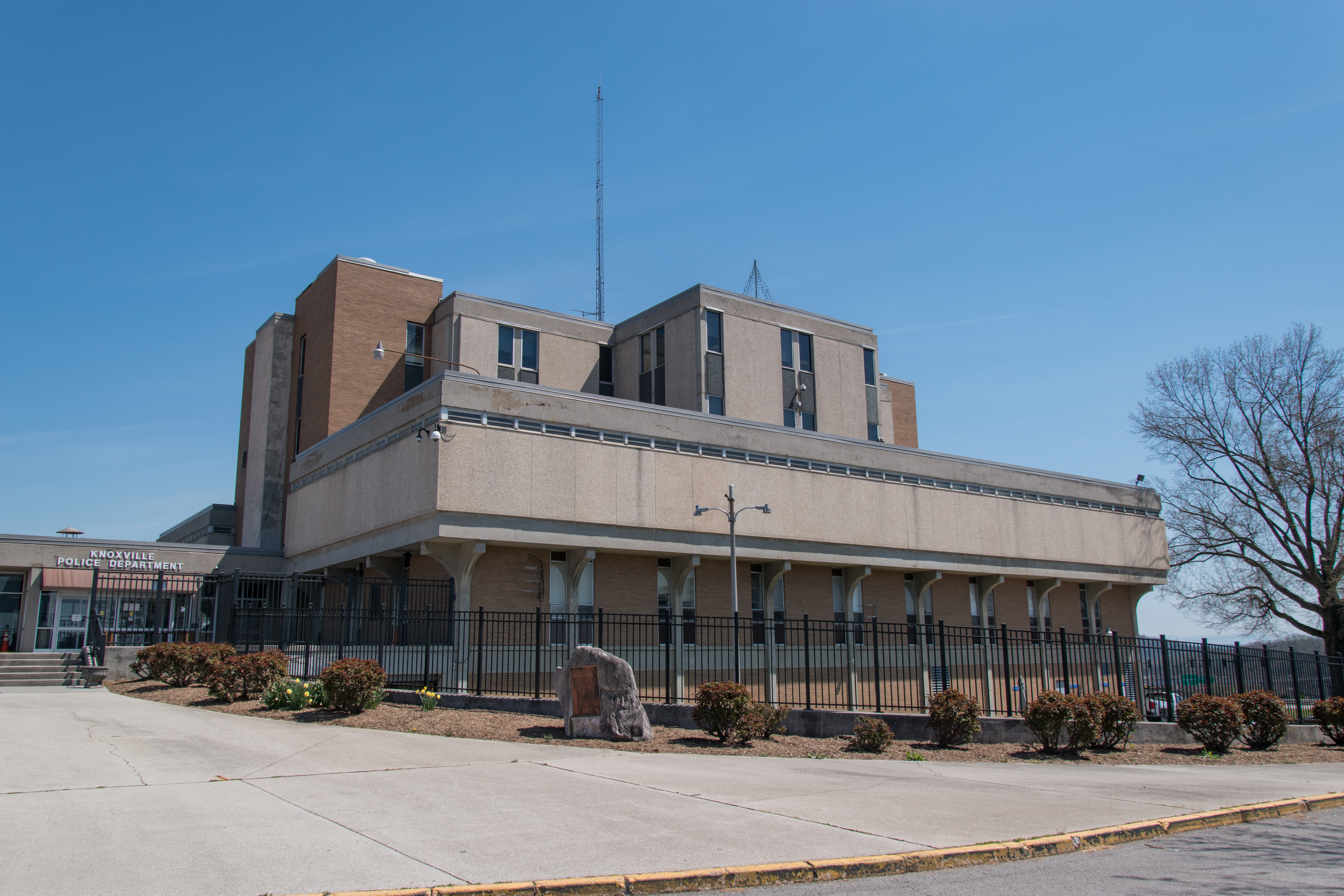
Knoxville Police Department headquarters

The Knoxville Fire Department (KFD) provides Class 2 ISO service inside the city limits. The fire department operates 19 stations with 308 uniformed personnel. KFD provides firefighting, first responder EMS response, vehicle extrication and HazMat response within the city limits.

The Knoxville Police Department serves the citizens of Knoxville with 378 officers and a total of 530 employees. Chief Paul Noel has led the department since June of 2022.

911 ambulance service inside Knoxville is provided by AMR Ambulance under contract with Knox County.

Knoxville is home to the Tennessee Supreme Court's courthouse for East Tennessee.

=== City Council ===
Knoxville is governed by a mayor and a nine-member City Council, six of which represent from single-member districts and three members are elected at-large. Council members are elected through a nonpartisan, district-wide primary in which top two vote-getters advance to a city-wide runoff election in November. Council members are elected to serve a four-year term that is eligible for reelection once.

List of City Council Members
District	Member	Took office
1	Karyn Adams	2025
2	Nathan Honeycutt	2025
3	Doug Lloyd	2025
4	Matthew DeBardelaben	2025
5	Charles Thomas	2019
6	Denzel Grant	2025
At-large A	Lynne Fugate	2019
At-large B	Debbie Helsley	2023
At-large C	Amelia Parker	2019

=== List of mayors ===
Mayors of Knoxville, Tennessee
- Thomas Emmerson, 1816-1817
- James Park, 1818–1821
- William C. Mynatt, 1822–1823, 1827, 1835–1836
- James Park, 1824–1826
- Joseph Churchill Strong, 1828–1831
- Donald McIntosh, 1832–1833
- Solomon D. Jacobs, 1834–1835
- Frederick Steidinger Heiskell, 1835
- James King, 1837
- William Baine Alexander Ramsey, 1838–1839
- Samuel Bell, 1840–1841, 1844–1845
- Gideon Morgan Hazen, 1842
- Matthew Moore Gaines, 1843
- Joseph Lewis King, 1846
- Samuel B. Boyd, 1847–1851
- George McNutt White, 1852–1853
- James C. Luttrell, 1854, 1859–1867
- William Graham Swan, 1855–1856
- James Harvey Cowan, 1856, 1858
- Thomas J. Powell, 1857
- Samuel Davies Carrick White, 1857
- Albert Morgan Piper, 1858
- Charles James McClung, 1858
- Joseph Jaques, 1858, 1878
- James M. White, 1858
- Marcus DeLafayette Bearden, 1868–1869
- John Somers Van Gilder, 1870–1872
- William Rule, 1873, 1898–1899
- Peter Staub, 1874–1875, 1881–1882
- Daniel A. Carpenter, 1876–1877
- Samuel Bell Luttrell, 1879
- Hardy Bryan Branner, 1880
- Reuben S. Payne, 1882
- William Clark Fulcher, 1883–1884
- James Churchwell Luttrell, III, 1885–1887
- Martin Condon, 1888–1889
- Peter Kern, 1890–1891
- M. E. Thompson, 1892–1895
- Samuel Gordon Heiskell, 1896–1897, 1900–1901, 1906–1907, 1910–1915
- Joseph Tedford McTeer, 1902–1903
- John Paul Murphy, 1904
- William H. Gass, 1904–1905
- John McMillan Brooks, 1908–1909
- Sam E. Hill, 1912
- John Edgar McMillan, 1916–1919
- Ernest Wesley Neal, 1920–1923
- Benjamin A. Morton, 1924–1927
- James Alexander Fowler, 1928–1929
- James A. Trent, 1930–1931
- John T. O'Connor, 1932–1935
- James W. Elmore, 1936–1937
- Walter W. Mynatt, 1938–1939
- Frederick Leland "Fred" Allen, 1940–1941
- Fred R. Stair, 1942–1943
- Erastus Eugene Patton, 1944–1945
- Cas Walker, 1946 and 1959
- Edward L. Chavannes, 1946–1947
- James W. Elmore, Jr., 1948–1951
- George Roby Dempster, 1952–1955
- Jack W. Dance, 1956–1959
- John J. Duncan, 1959–1964
- Robert L. Crossley, 1964
- Leonard Reid Rogers, 1965–1971
- Kyle Testerman, 1972–1975, 1984–1987
- Randy Tyree, 1976–1983
- Victor Ashe, 1988–2003
- Bill Haslam, 2003–2011
- Daniel Brown, 2011, first African-American mayor
- Madeline Rogero, 2011–2019
- Indya Kincannon, 2019–

== Education ==
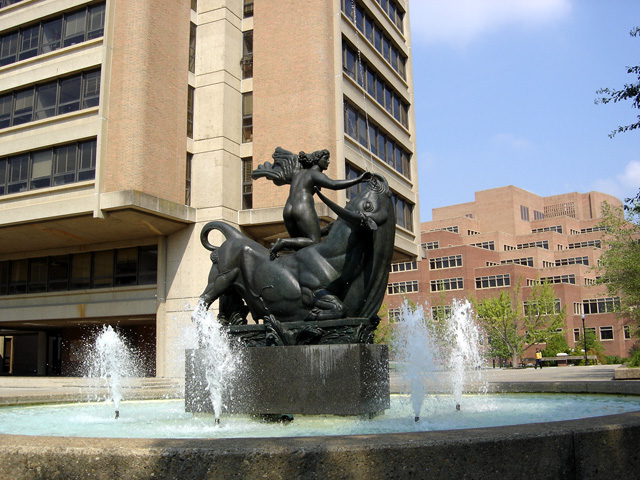
The University of Tennessee at Knoxville is the state's flagship public university. (Pictured: McClung Plaza)

Aerial of part of the University of Tennessee at Knoxville campus

Knoxville is home to the main campus of the University of Tennessee (UTK), which has operated in the city since the 1790s. As of 2011, UTK had an enrollment of over 27,000 and endowments of over $300 million. The school employs over 1,300 instructional faculty, and offers more than 300 degree programs.

Pellissippi State Community College is a two-year school governed by the Tennessee Board of Regents that offers transfer programs, two-year degrees, and certificate programs. Its main campus is located off Pellissippi Parkway in western Knox County. As of 2011, the school had a system-wide enrollment of over 11,000 students.

Johnson University (formerly Johnson Bible College) is a Bible college affiliated with the Christian churches and churches of Christ. As of 2012, the school had an enrollment of 845. Johnson traditionally specializes in training preachers and ministers, but also offers degrees in counseling, teaching, music, and nonprofit management.

South College (formerly Knoxville Business College) is a for-profit school located in West Knoxville that offers undergraduate and graduate programs in business, health care, criminal justice, and legal fields. The school had an enrollment of 717 as of 2010.

Knoxville College was a historically Black college that began operating in Knoxville in the 1870s. The school offered a Bachelor of Science in Liberal Studies and an Associate of Arts degree. Knoxville College had an enrollment of about 100 students as of 2010 and closed permanently in 2015.

Institutions with branch campuses in Knoxville include Carson-Newman University, King University, Lincoln Memorial University (namely, the Duncan School of Law), National College of Business & Technology, Roane State Community College, Strayer University, Tennessee Wesleyan University, and Tusculum University. Virginia College offers career programs in Knoxville. Huntington University of Health Sciences, which offers distance courses in nutrition and health, has its offices in Knoxville.

=== Primary and secondary education ===
Public schools in Knoxville are part of the Knox County Schools system, which oversees 89 schools (50 elementary, 14 middle, 14 high, and 11 adult centers) serving over 56,000 students. This system includes five magnet schools and a STEM academy. Knox County high schools had a graduation rate of 86.6%, as of 2011. The average classroom ratio is 14 students per teacher.

Knox County is home to over 50 private and parochial schools, the largest of which include the Christian Academy of Knoxville, the Webb School of Knoxville, Knoxville Catholic High School, Concord Christian School (home of Markus), Grace Christian Academy, Cedar Springs Weekday School, and Sacred Heart Cathedral School.

== Media ==
The Knoxville News Sentinel is the local daily newspaper in Knoxville, with a daily circulation of 14,247 as of 2025.

The city is home to several weekly, bi-weekly, and monthly publications.

As of 2011, the Knoxville television market was the 61st largest in the U.S. with 527,790 homes, according to Nielsen Market Research. The largest local television station is NBC affiliate WBIR-TV, with 28,305 viewing households, followed by ABC affiliate WATE-TV (23,559), CBS affiliate WVLT-TV (20,052), Fox affiliate WTNZ (10,319), and CW affiliate WBXX-TV (5,415). Other local stations include WKNX-TV (Ind.), WVLR (CTN) and WPXK (Ion). East Tennessee PBS operates Knoxville's Public Broadcasting Service station at WKOP 17.

Discovery, Inc. operates the former Scripps Networks Interactive cable television networks from Knoxville, including HGTV, Magnolia Network, Food Network and Cooking Channel. Jewelry Television, a home shopping channel, is also based in the city, and several companies that provide production services to the ex-SNI networks also maintain Knoxville operations.

According to Arbitron's 2011 Radio Market Rankings, Knoxville had the nation's 72nd-largest radio market, with 684,700 households. In 2010, country music station WIVK (107.7 FM) had the market's highest AQH share at 16.3, followed by adult contemporary station WJXB (97.5 FM) at 10.1, and news/talk station WCYQ (100.3 FM) at 8.3. Other stations include Rock music stations WIMZ (103.5 FM) and WNFZ (94.3), Rhythmic Top 40 station WKHT (104.5 FM), contemporary hit station WWST (102.1 FM), and National Public Radio station WUOT (91.9 FM). The University of Tennessee radio station operates under WUTK (90.3 FM).

=== Filming location ===
A number of films and television programs were filmed in the city, such as the 1950 film noir Woman in Hiding starring Ida Lupino and Howard Duff, the 1963 film All the Way Home which was based on Knoxville native James Agee's novel A Death in the Family, the 1965 film The Fool Killer starring Anthony Perkins and Edward Albert, the 1970 film A Walk in the Spring Rain starring Anthony Quinn and Ingrid Bergman, the 1996 film Box of Moonlight, starring John Turturro and Sam Rockwell, the 1999 film October Sky starring Jake Gyllenhaal and Chris Cooper, the 2000 film Road Trip at the University of Tennessee campus, the 2004 film The Heart Is Deceitful Above All Things, the 2009 film That Evening Sun starring Hal Holbrook and Ray McKinnon, the 2017 film The Last Movie Star starring Ariel Winter and Burt Reynolds in one of his last roles, and the 2019 film Light from Light starring Marin Ireland and Jim Gaffigan.

== Infrastructure ==
=== Health ===
Knox County's hospital system contains over 2,600 licensed beds in seven general use hospitals and one children's hospital. The city's largest hospital as of 2011 was the University of Tennessee Medical Center, which had 581 beds, followed by Fort Sanders Regional Medical Center (541), Parkwest Medical Center (462), and Physicians Regional (370). The city's largest ambulatory surgery center was the Parkwest Surgery Center, which employed 58 physicians and 35 nurses, followed by the Fort Sanders West Outpatient Surgery Center and the St. Mary's Ambulatory Surgery Center South.

2021 County Health Rankings places Knox county at 13th out the 95 counties. Life expectancy was 76.3 years. Health behaviors noted: 19% smokers versus state average of 21%, 29% of the population is obese vs 33% for the state, excessive drinking is 19% vs 17%, drug overdoses 52 per 100,000 with the state at 28 overdoses per 100,000.

In the 2010s, Knoxville's air quality continued to greatly improve over that of past decades according to the American Lung Association's State of the Air 2017.

=== Utilities ===
The Knoxville Utilities Board (KUB) provides electricity, water, and wastewater management to Knoxville residents and businesses. KUB's service area covers 688 square miles and includes over 5,200 miles of power lines providing electricity to over 196,000 customers. The average electric bill was just over $96 per month. KUB purchases its electricity from the Tennessee Valley Authority.

=== Transportation ===
==== Highways ====
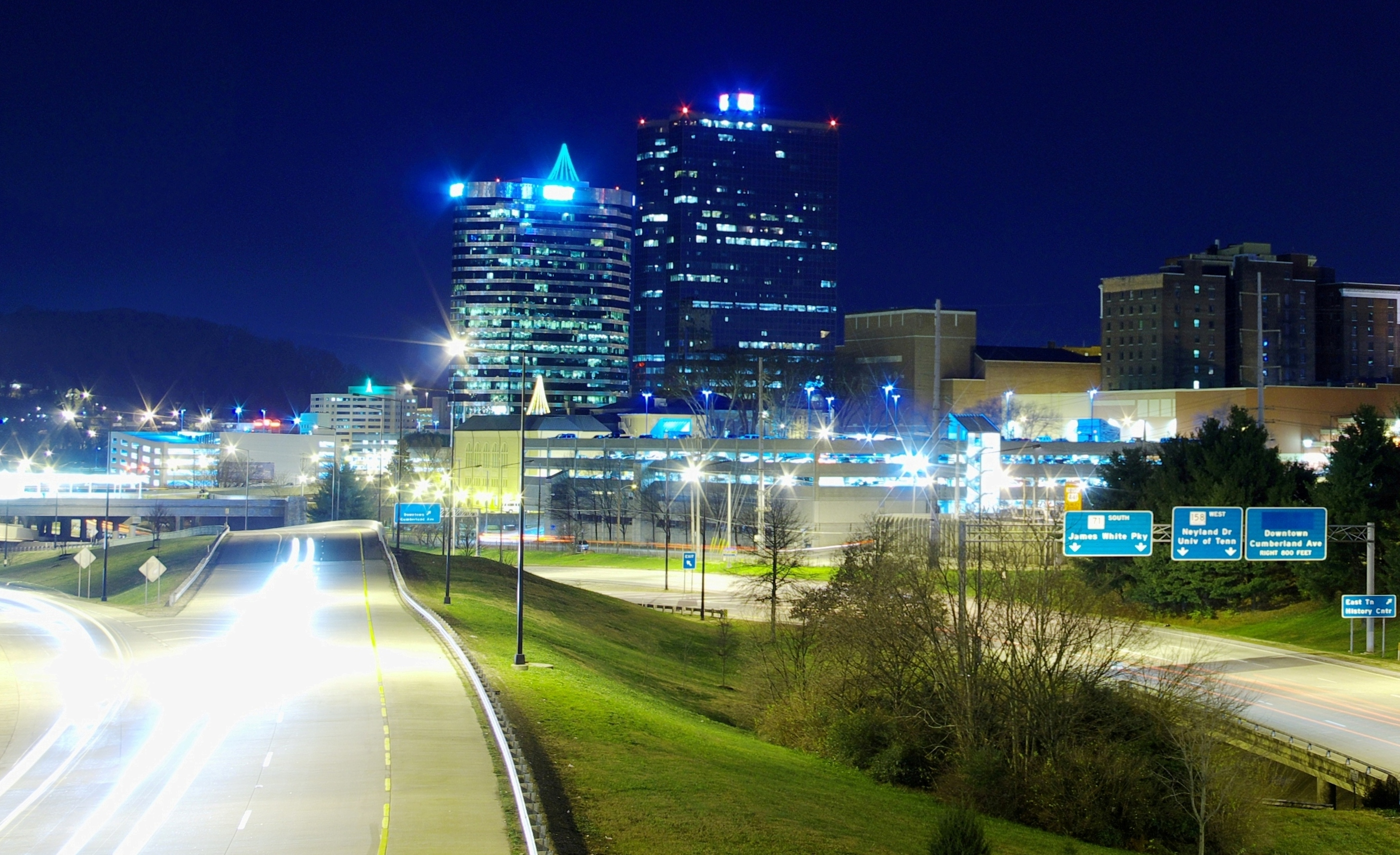
The James White Parkway connects I-40 with Downtown Knoxville.

The two principal interstate highways serving Knoxville are Interstate 40, which connects the city to Asheville (directly) and Bristol (via I-81) to the east and Nashville to the west, and Interstate 75, which connects the city to Chattanooga to the south and Lexington to the north. The two interstates merge about 20 miles (32 km) west of Downtown Knoxville near Dixie Lee Junction and diverge as they approach the Downtown area, with I-40 continuing on through the Downtown area and I-75 turning north. Interstate 640 provides a bypass for I-40 travelers, and Interstate 275 provides a faster connection to I-75 for Downtown travelers headed north. A spur route of I-40, Interstate 140 (Pellissippi Parkway), connects West Knoxville with McGhee Tyson Airport and Maryville.

Prior to its reconstruction for the 1982 World's Fair tourism traffic, the interchange of I-75 (now I-275) and I-40 was known as "Malfunction Junction", because its consistent state of traffic jammed throughout daily.

Knoxville's busiest road is a stretch of U.S. Route 129 known as Alcoa Highway, which connects the Downtown area with McGhee Tyson Airport and Maryville. A merged stretch of US-70 and US-11 enters the city from the east along Magnolia Avenue, winds its way through the Downtown area, crosses the U.T. campus along Cumberland Avenue ("The Strip"), and proceeds through West Knoxville along Kingston Pike. US-11 splits into US-11E and 11W in Downtown, with the former connecting Knoxville to Jefferson City and Morristown, and the latter with Rutledge and Bean Station. US-441, which connects Knoxville to the Great Smoky Mountains National Park, passes along Broadway in North Knoxville, Henley Street in the Downtown area, and Chapman Highway in South Knoxville. US-25W, which enters from the east concurrent with US-70, connects Knoxville with Clinton.

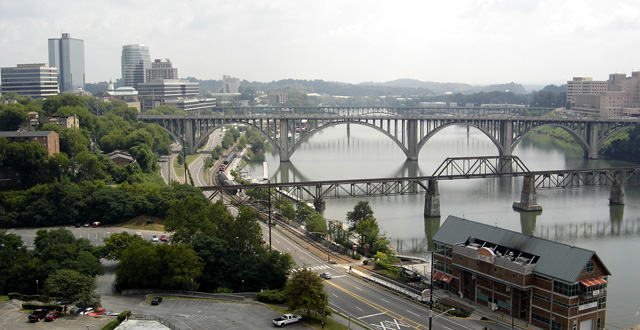
Bridges over the Tennessee River

State Route 158 (SR 158) loops around the Downtown area from Kingston Pike just west of UT's campus, southward and eastward along Neyland Drive and the riverfront, and northward along the James White Parkway before terminating at I-40. SR 62 (Western Avenue, Oak Ridge Highway), connects Downtown Knoxville with Oak Ridge to the west. SR 168, known as Governor John Sevier Highway, runs along the eastern and southern periphery of the city. SR 162 (Pellissippi Parkway) connects West Knoxville with Oak Ridge. SR 331 (Tazewell Pike) connects the Fountain City area to rural northeast Knox County. SR 332 (Northshore Drive) connects West Knoxville and Concord. SR 33 (Maryville Pike, Maynardville Pike) traverses much of South Knoxville southward, and connects to the suburbs of Halls Crossroads and Maynardville northward.

Four vehicle bridges connect Downtown Knoxville with South Knoxville, namely the South Knoxville Bridge (also called James White Parkway, officially named James C. Ford Memorial Bridge), the Gay Street Bridge (Gay Street), the Henley Street Bridge, or Henley Bridge (Henley Street), and the J. E. "Buck" Karnes Bridge (Alcoa Highway). Two railroad bridges, located between the Henley Street Bridge and Buck Karnes Bridge, serve the CSX and Northfolk Southern railroads. Smaller bridges radiating out from the downtown area include the Western Avenue Viaduct and Clinch Avenue Viaduct, the Robert Booker Bridge (Summit Hill Drive), the Hill Avenue Viaduct, and the Gay Street Viaduct.

==== Mass transit ====
Public transportation is provided by Knoxville Area Transit (KAT), which operates over 80 buses, road trolleys, and paratransit vehicles, and transports more than 3.6 million passengers per year. Regular routes connect the Downtown area, U.T., and most residential areas with major shopping centers throughout the city. KAT operates using city, state, and federal funds, and passenger fares, and is managed by Veolia Transport.

==== Airports ====
Knoxville and the surrounding area is served by McGhee Tyson Airport (IATA:TYS), a 2,250-acre (910 ha) airport equipped with two runways, one a 10,000-foot (3,000 m) runway, and the other a 9,000-foot (2,700 m) runway. The airport is located 10 miles south of Knoxville in Alcoa, but is owned by the non-profit Metropolitan Knoxville Airport Authority (MKAA). McGhee Tyson offers eight major airlines serving 19 non-stop destinations, and averages 120 arrivals and departures per day. The airport includes the 21-acre (8.5 ha) Air Cargo Complex, which serves FedEx, UPS, and Airborne Express. The McGhee Tyson Air National Guard Base, located adjacent to the civilian airport, is home to the Tennessee National Guard's 134th Air Refueling Wing.

The MKAA also owns the Downtown Island Airport, a 200-acre (81 ha) general aviation facility located on Dickinson's Island in southeast Knoxville. This airport is equipped with a 3,500-foot (1,100 m) runway, and averages about 225 operations per day. Over 100 aircraft, mostly single-engine planes, are based at the airport.

==== Railroads ====
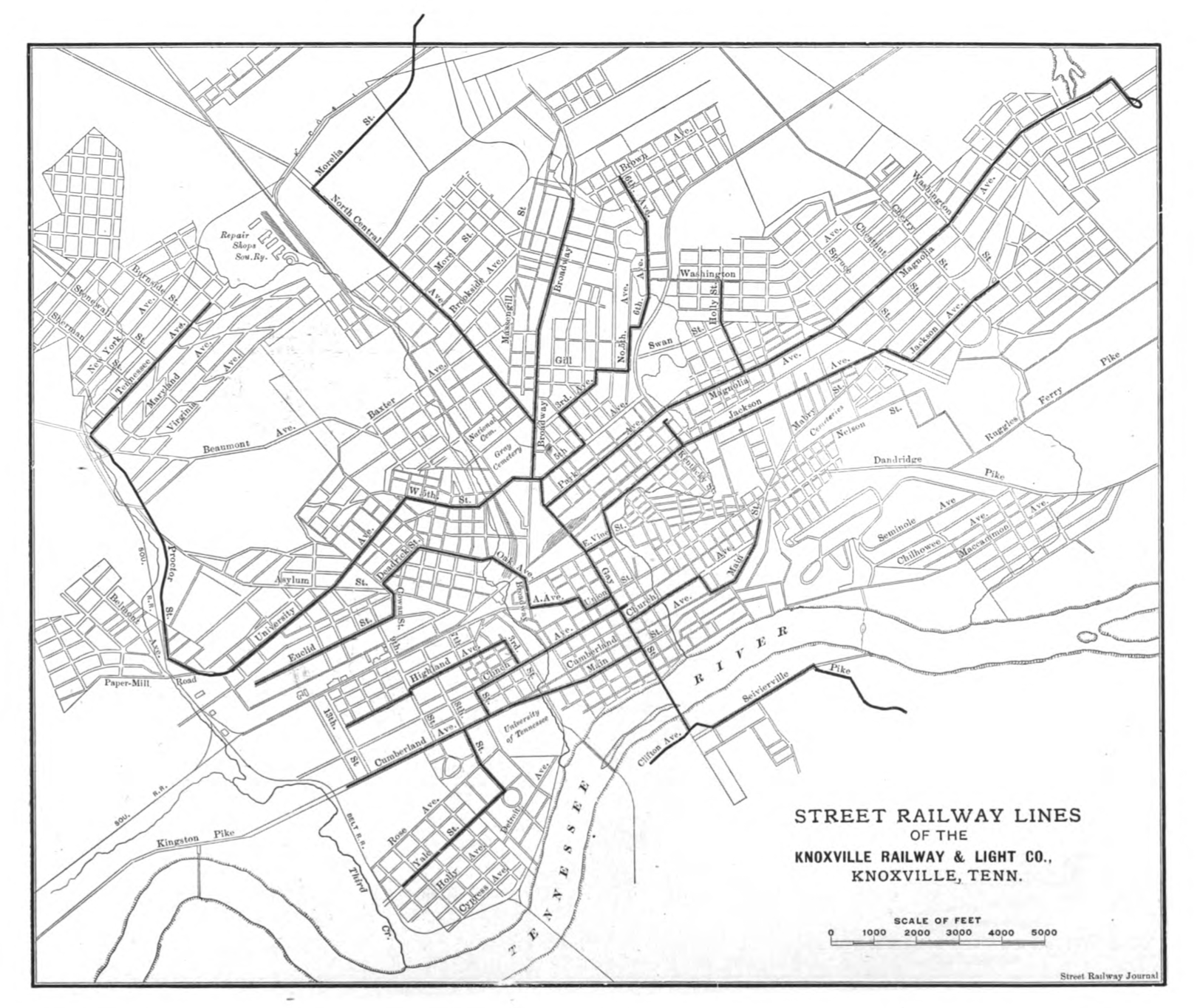
Map of Street Railway Lines of the Knoxville Railway and Light Company c 1907

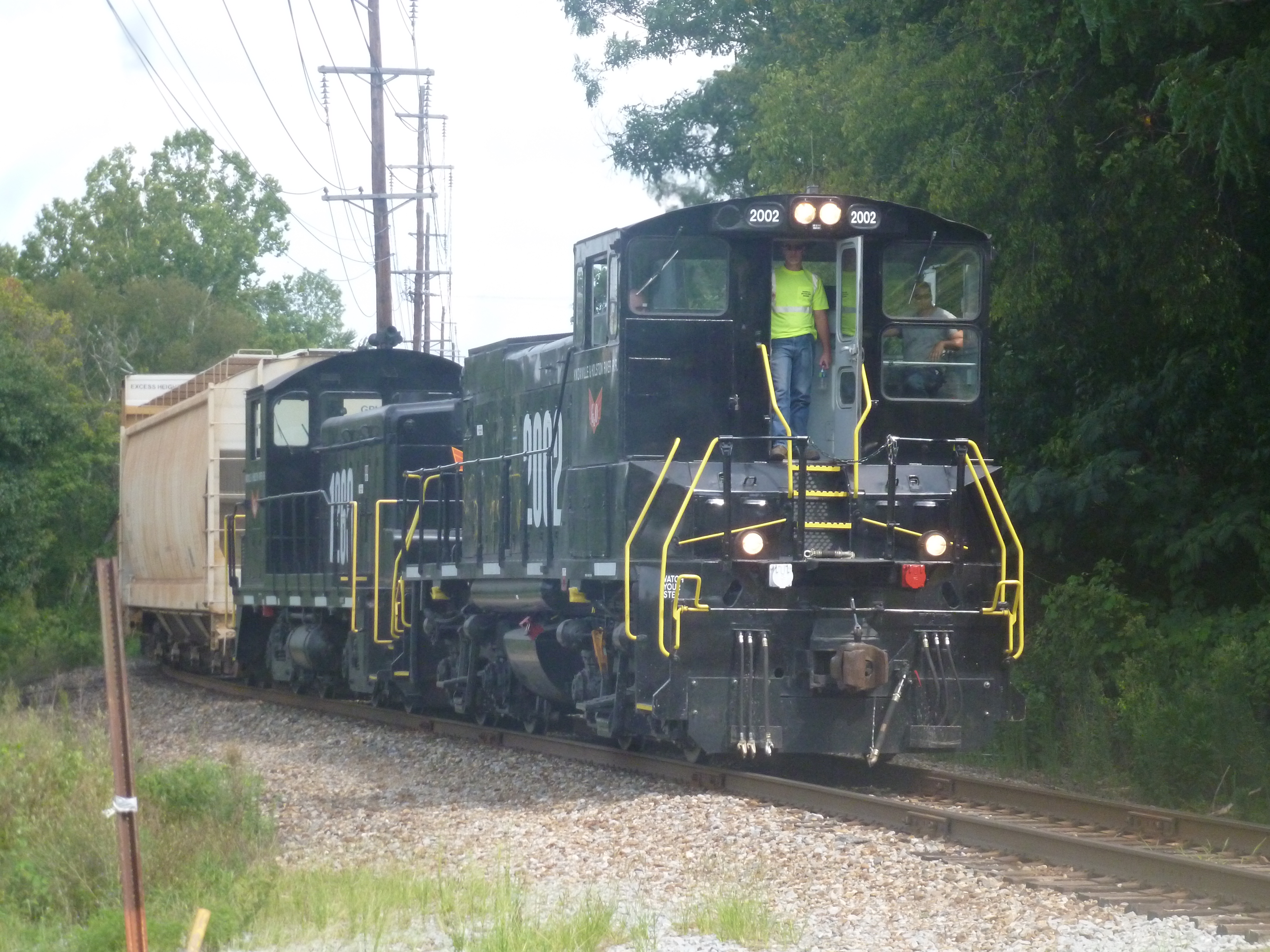
Knoxville and Holston River Railroad MP15AC #2002 leads a train through Tyson Park near downtown Knoxville.

Rail freight in Knoxville is handled by two Class I railroads, CSX and Norfolk Southern, and one shortline, the Knoxville and Holston River Railroad. Railroads account for about 12% of the Knoxville area's outbound freight and 16% of the area's inbound freight. The city has two major rail terminals: the Burkhart Enterprises terminal at the Forks of the River Industrial Park just east of the city, and the TransFlo facility adjacent to the U.T. campus. Knoxville's two old passenger stations, the Southern Terminal and the L&N Station, now serve non-railroad functions.

Norfolk Southern, which controls about 210 miles (340 km) of tracks in the Knoxville area, averages 35 freight trains through the city per day, and operates a major classification yard, the John Sevier Yard, just east of the city. The company uses a small rail yard near the I-40/I-275 interchange in Downtown Knoxville for a staging area. The Norfolk Southern system includes spur lines to the coal fields around Middlesboro, Kentucky, and the ALCOA plants in Blount County.

CSX controls about 76 miles (122 km) of tracks in the Knoxville area, much of which is located along an important north–south line between Cincinnati and Louisville to the north and Chattanooga and Atlanta to the south. Minor switching operations for CSX occur at the TransFlo facility near the U.T. campus. The CSX system includes spur lines to TVA's Bull Run Fossil Plant and the Oak Ridge National Laboratory in Anderson County, and the ALCOA plants in Blount County.

The Knoxville and Holston River Railroad (KXHR) is a subsidiary of Gulf and Ohio Railways, a shortline holding company headquartered at the James Park House in Downtown Knoxville. The KXHR operates a 19-mile (31 km) line between the Burkhart terminal at Forks of the River and the Coster Yard in North Knoxville, where the freight is transferred to CSX and Norfolk Southern lines or transloaded onto trucks. The KXHR also manages the Knoxville Locomotive Works at the Coster Yard, and operates the Three Rivers Rambler, a tourist train that runs along the riverfront.

===== Historic passenger service =====
Until the mid-20th century, three railroads and their stations operated regular trains, serving points north, east, south and west: the Louisville and Nashville Railroad's L&N Station (last train operating there, 1968), the Smoky Mountain Railroad's station and the Southern Railway's Southern Terminal (last train operating there, 1970).

==== River transport ====
Knoxville is an international port connected via navigable channels to the nation's inland waterways and the Gulf of Mexico. The city's waterfront lies just under 700 river miles from the Mississippi River (via the Tennessee and Ohio rivers), and just under 900 river miles from Mobile, Alabama, on the Gulf of Mexico (via the Tennessee River and Tennessee-Tombigbee Waterway). TVA maintains a minimum 9-foot (2.7 m) channel on the entirety of the Tennessee River. The minimum size of locks on Tennessee River and Tennessee-Tombigbee Waterway dams is 600 feet (180 m) by 110 feet (34 m).

Most commercial shipping on the Tennessee River is provided by barges, which deliver on average half a million tons of cargo to Knoxville per year, mostly asphalt, road salt, and steel and coke. Burkhart Enterprises operates the city's most active public barge terminal at its Forks of the River facility, handling approximately 350,000 tons of barge cargo per year. Knoxville Barge and Chattanooga-based Serodino, Inc., provide barge shipping services to and from the city.

Recreational craft that frequent the river include small johnboats, fishing boats and yachts. Boat slips and a marina are located at Volunteer Landing in the Downtown area. The VOL Navy, a flotilla of several dozen boats, swarms the river during weeks when the U.T. football team plays at Neyland Stadium. Cruise lines operating in the city include the Volunteer Princess, a luxury yacht, and the Star of Knoxville, a paddlewheel riverboat.

== In popular culture ==
Knoxville has appeared in music, literature and television. Film director Quentin Tarantino was born in Knoxville, and the city and East Tennessee are frequently mentioned in his films, such as in the 1994 film Pulp Fiction, in which Bruce Willis' character (and the watch given to him by Christopher Walken's character) is from Knoxville.

Mark Twain wrote about a gunfight in downtown Knoxville involving Joseph Mabry Jr., owner of the city's antebellum Mabry-Hazen House in Life on the Mississippi from 1883. Several other books take place in fictionalized versions of the city, such as the 1915 Anne W. Armstrong novel, The Seas of God, and David Madden's 1974 novel, Bijou, is set in a fictional city known as "Cherokee", based on Knoxville.

The first part of James Herman Robinson's 1950 autobiography, The Road Without Turning, takes place in Knoxville, and "The Man in the Overstuffed Chair", a 1985 short story by playwright Tennessee Williams, gives a brief description of the death of Williams' father, Cornelius, at a Knoxville hospital, and his subsequent burial at Old Gray Cemetery.

Pulitzer Prize-winning author Peter Taylor's last novel in 1994, In the Tennessee Country, refers to a "Knoxville cemetery" where the main character's grandfather (a fictitious politician) is buried. This may refer to Old Gray Cemetery, where Taylor's own grandfather, Governor Robert Love Taylor, was originally buried in 1912.

Swiss travel writer Annemarie Schwarzenbach visited Knoxville in the 1930s, and wrote an essay about the city, "Auf der Schattenseite von Knoxville", which was published in the December 1937 edition of the Swiss magazine, National Zeitung.

A number of songs and music compositions are about or feature Knoxville as well. "The Knoxville Girl", first recorded in 1924, is traditional Appalachian ballad. Classical composer Samuel Barber's "Knoxville: Summer of 1915" from 1947 is a voice & orchestra piece based on 1938 short prose by James Agee. Dire Straits guitarist Mark Knopfler composed and recorded a honky-tonk song entitled "Daddy's Gone to Knoxville" on his 2002 solo album, The Ragpicker's Dream, "The Ballad of Thunder Road" by Robert Mitchum references Knoxville's Bearden community, and other musicians such as Steve Earle, Ronnie Milsap, and Hank Williams, Jr. have mentioned the city in lyrics. Hank Williams, Hank Jr.'s father, spent his last day alive in Knoxville as well. Country singer Kenny Chesney is from Knoxville.

A number of early country music songs were recorded in Knoxville as the "St. James Sessions" in 1930, such as "Satan is Busy In Knoxville" by Leola Manning.

Knoxville and the 1982 World's Fair were featured prominently in an episode of The Simpsons, "Bart on the Road". In the episode, Bart, having obtained a fake ID, travels to Knoxville with his friends to visit the fair after seeing an advertisement in a tourism brochure, only to learn that it closed a decade before.

== See also ==
- National Register of Historic Places listings in Knox County, Tennessee
- List of people from Knoxville, Tennessee
