= Parkridge, Knoxville =

- Park City Historic District
- U.S. National Register of Historic Places
- U.S. Historic district
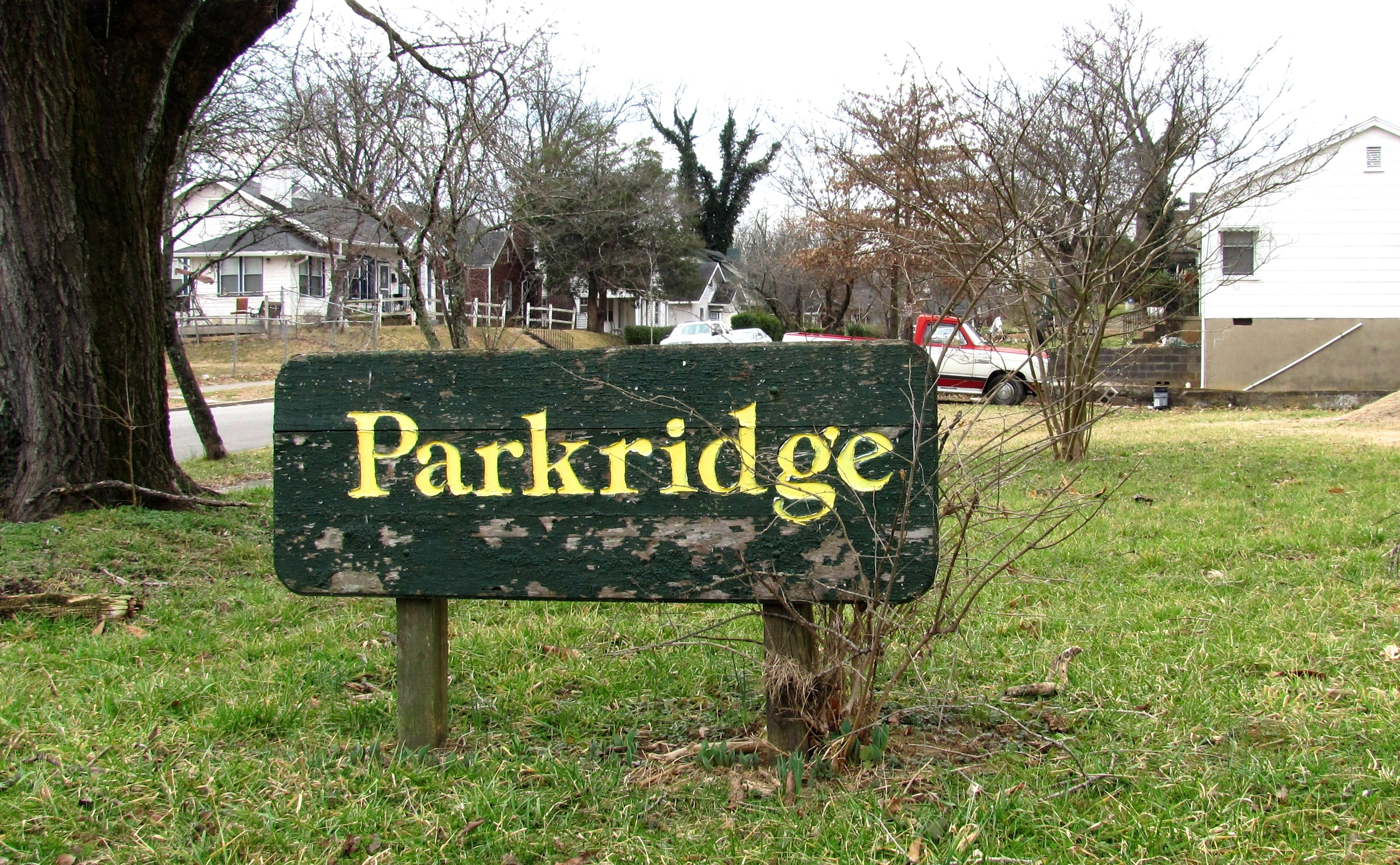
- Location: East Fifth, Jefferson, Woodbine and Washington Avenues; Knoxville, Tennessee
- Coordinates: 35°59′13″N 83°53′56″W
- Area: approximately 191 acres (77 ha)
- Built: 1880–1940
- Architect: George Franklin Barber, John Ryno, others
- Architectural style: Tudor Revival, Queen Anne, Folk Victorian
- NRHP reference No.: 90001578
- Added to NRHP: October 25, 1990

Parkridge is a neighborhood in Knoxville, Tennessee, United States, located off Magnolia Avenue east of the city's downtown area. Developed as a streetcar suburb for Knoxville's professional class in the 1890s, the neighborhood was incorporated as the separate city of Park City in 1907, and annexed by Knoxville in 1917. In the early 1900s, the neighborhood provided housing for workers at the nearby Standard Knitting Mill factory.

In 1990, over 600 houses in Parkridge were listed on the National Register of Historic Places as the Park City Historic District. The neighborhood contains one of the largest concentrations of houses designed by George Franklin Barber (1854–1915), a mail-order architect known nationwide for his ornate Victorian house plans.

== Location ==
Parkridge is located in East Knoxville, and is bounded by Interstate 40 on the north, Magnolia Avenue (part of US-70) on the south, Hall of Fame Drive on the west, and Cherry Street on the east. The Chilhowee Park neighborhood lies opposite Cherry Street to the east, Fourth and Gill lies opposite Hall of Fame Drive to the west, Morningside lies to the south, and North Hills lies opposite I-40 to the northeast. First Creek has traditionally divided the area from Downtown Knoxville to the southwest, and expressway construction, namely Hall of Fame Drive and the James White Parkway, has sharpened this division in recent decades.

== History ==
=== Lake Ottossee ===
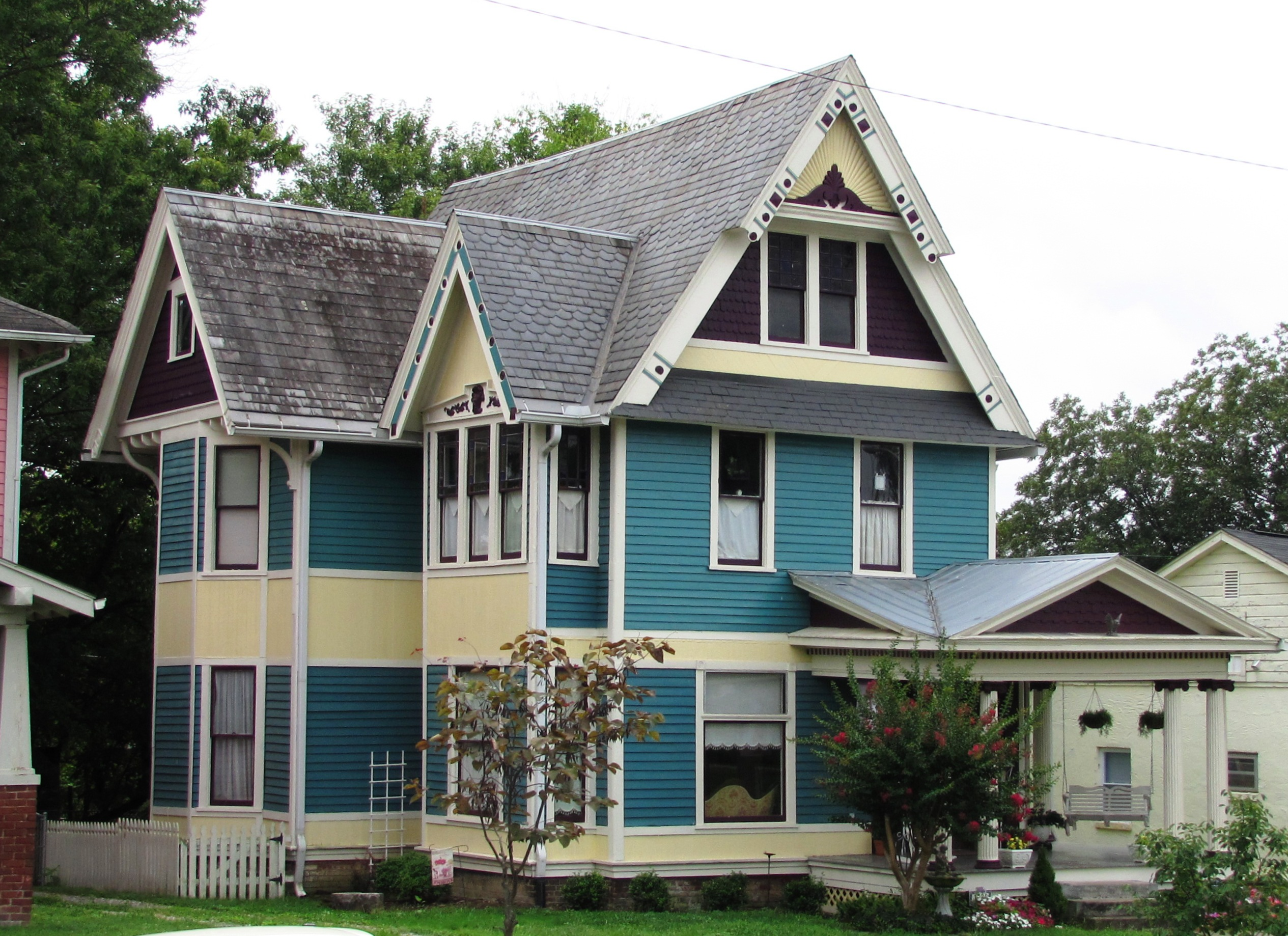
The W.O. Haworth House on Washington Avenue, one of over a dozen houses in Parkridge designed by George Franklin Barber

What is now Parkridge was once part of a vast farm owned by Moses White, the son of Knoxville founder James White. By the mid-19th century, much of this land had been acquired by Joseph Mabry, whose house still stands atop Mabry Hill to the south. During the 1850s, a developer named John Shields established Shieldstown between First Creek and modern Bertrand Street, near what is now the Old City, which by 1880 had a population of 700.

In 1875, Fernando Cortes Beaman (1836–1911), a college professor, purchased an 1,100-acre (450 ha) dairy farm east of Shieldstown from the descendants of Alexander McMillan. This included what is now Chilhowee Park, which Beaman began developing in the mid-1880s, namely with the creation of "Lake Ottossee," and the erection of a dance pavilion. A road, Park Avenue (modern Magnolia), was constructed to connect the park with Downtown Knoxville. In 1890, streetcar entrepreneur William Gibbs McAdoo agreed to build an electric streetcar line along Park Avenue, springing residential development in the areas between the park and Downtown Knoxville.

=== Park City ===
Around 1888, the Edgewood Land and Improvement Company initiated the development of Parkridge, namely with the division of lots in what is now the western part of the neighborhood. Streets in Parkridge still roughly follow the gridlike pattern laid out by this company and other developers during this period. Other developments included the Poplar Springs subdivision, established by Preston Blang in the vicinity of what is now Linden and Bertrand, and Elmwood, in the vicinity of what is now Woodbine and Boruff. A black community was developed in the area of Adams, Dodson and Nichols.

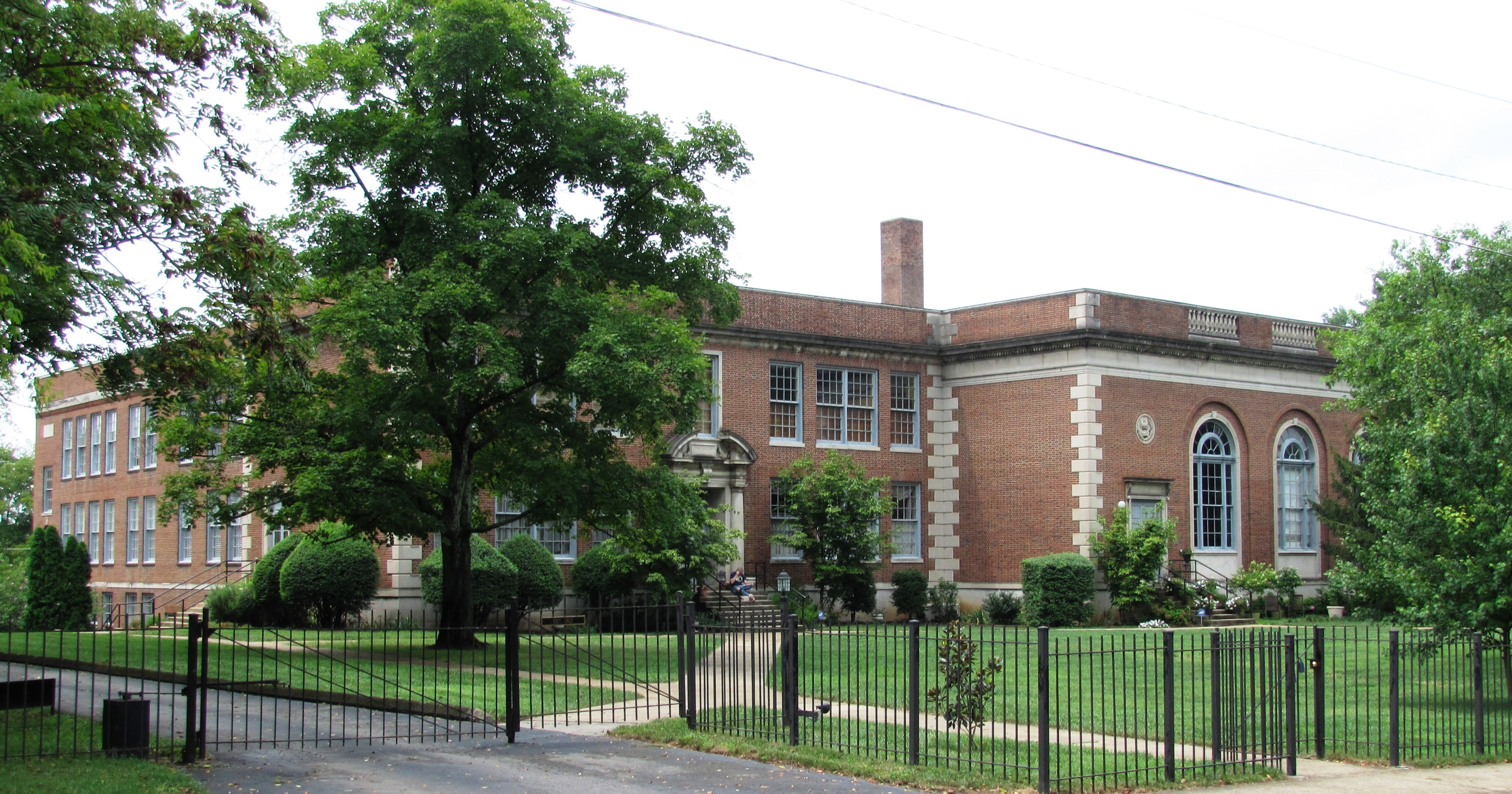
Park Place condominiums, originally Park City Junior High, built in 1927 and designed by Baumann and Baumann; renovated by Kristopher Kendrick in the 1990s

One of the partners in this company was architect George Franklin Barber, who would eventually become known nationwide for his catalog designs. Barber designed numerous houses in the new subdivision, including his own house, which still stands at 1635 Washington Avenue. Barber lived in this house until 1895, and his company's draftsmen continued boarding at the house until the early 1900s. The designs of several Barber houses along Washington and Jefferson avenues were featured in Barber's catalogs, which were sold worldwide over the subsequent two decades.

The various new subdivisions along Park Avenue incorporated as Park City in 1907, with W. R. Johnson serving as mayor. The new city had a population of 7,000, and its new school, Park City High School, had an enrollment of over 1,000 students, making it one of the largest in the state (the school building was designed by Barber and his new partner, R. F. Graf). The city benefited from the three national expositions held at Chilhowee Park, namely the Appalachian Expositions of 1910 and 1911, and the National Conservation Exposition of 1913. In 1917, Park City was annexed by Knoxville.

=== 20th century ===
During the 1920s, Knoxville's more affluent residents began moving to automobile suburbs on the outskirts of town, and the city's streetcar suburbs, including Park City, gradually transitioned into working-class neighborhoods. One of Park City's primary employers, Standard Knitting Mills, built a large factory on the neighborhood's western end in 1900. At its height, this factory employed over 3,000 workers. It closed in 1989. The neighborhood's modern name, "Parkridge," is a combination of "Park City" and "Chestnut Ridge," the latter referring to predominantly black community located just north of Park City.

== Park City Historic District ==
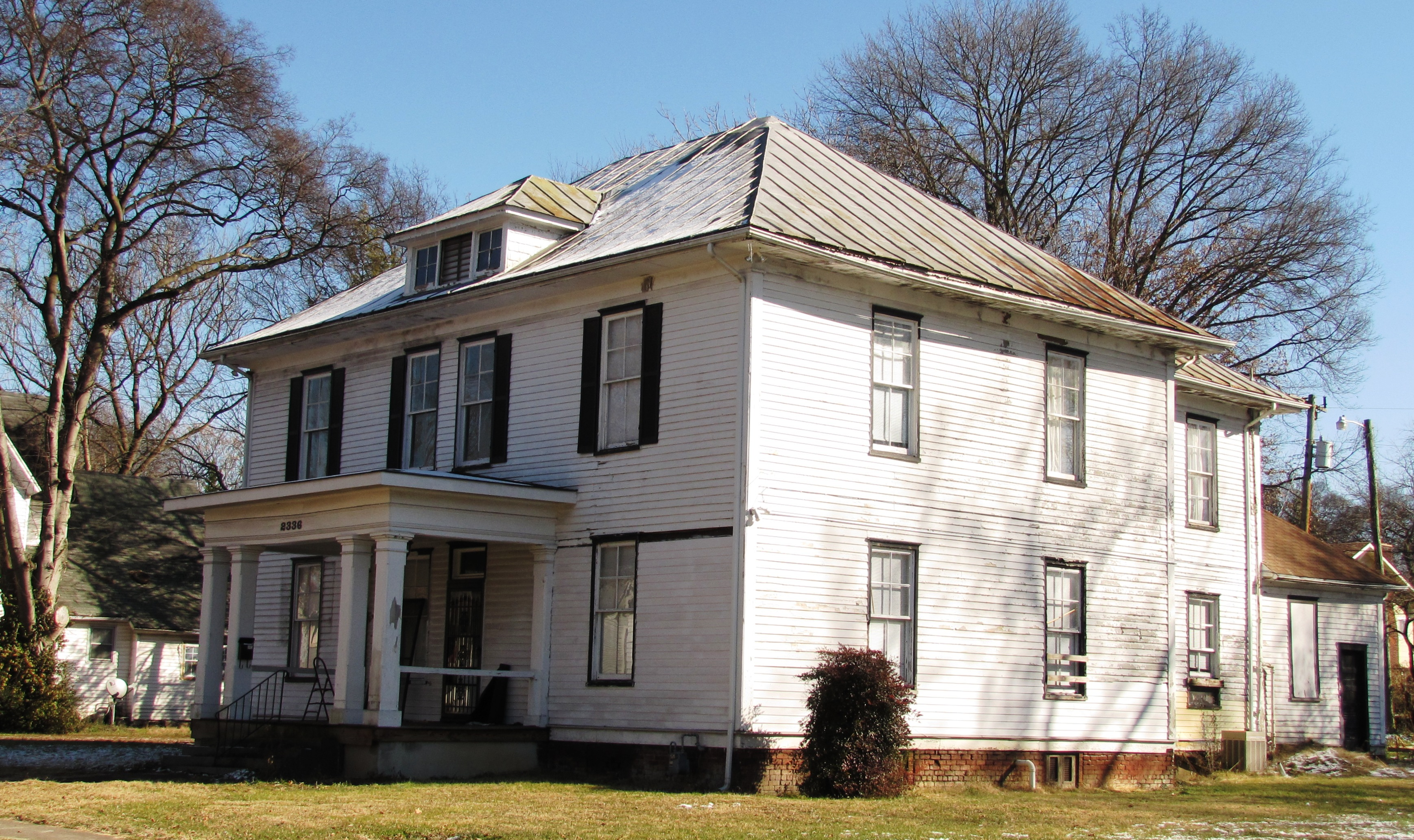
This house on Woodbine Avenue once served as Knoxville's Florence Crittenton Home

In 1990, a large portion of Parkridge was added to the National Register of Historic Places as the Park City Historic District. This district contains 678 contributing buildings, the most of any of the Knox County's National Register-listed historic district. Most of the buildings were constructed in the first half of the 20th century, and have architectural styles ranging from Bungalow/Craftsman to Tudor Revival. Several notable Victorian houses built during the late 19th century survive, however, especially along Washington and Jefferson avenues.

=== Notable properties ===
- George Franklin Barber House (1635 Washington Ave.), a Queen Anne-style house built in 1889 and designed by architect George Franklin Barber. Barber lived here from 1889 until 1895.
- Alonzo Cash House (1712 Washington Ave.), built in 1889 and designed by George Franklin Barber. This house was featured as design #3 in Barber's catalog, The Cottage Souvenir.
- W. O. Haworth House (1724 Washington Ave.), built in 1889 and design by George Franklin Barber. This house was featured as design #35 in Barber's The Cottage Souvenir No. 2.
- F. E. McArthur House (1701 Jefferson Ave.), built in 1889 and designed by George Franklin Barber. This house was featured as design #40 in Barber's The Cottage Souvenir No. 2.
- D. D. Remer House (1618 Washington Ave.), built in 1890 and designed by George Franklin Barber. This house, restored by Knox Heritage in 2006, was featured as design #65B in Barber's New Modern Dwellings.
- Joshua Deaver House (1803 Washington Ave.), built in 1893 and designed by George Franklin Barber. This house was featured as design #63 in Barber's New Modern Dwellings.
- 2041 Washington Avenue, a Queen Anne-style house built c. 1893 and designed by architect John Ryno, a later partner of George Barber. Ryno lived here during the 1890s.
- 2336 Woodbine Avenue, an American Foursquare-style house built c. 1900. This house served as Knoxville Florence Crittenton home for several years.
- 2511 East Fifth Avenue, a Craftsman-style house with Prairie features, built c. 1915.
- 2512 East Fifth Avenue, a Bungalow-style house with Prairie features, built c. 1915.
- 2331 and 2343 Washington Avenue, identical two-story Eastlake-style houses, built c. 1890.
- Central Church of Christ (1932 Woodbine Ave.), a two-story cement block church constructed c. 1910.
- Fifth Avenue Baptist Church (2500 E. Fifth Ave.), a brick church constructed in the neoclassical style c. 1921.
- Park Lane (1721 E. Fifth Ave.), a two-story apartment building constructed c. 1915 in the Colonial Revival style.
- Pleasanttree (2460 E. Fifth Ave.), an Italian Renaissance-style apartment building constructed c. 1925.
- Stewart Building (2362 E. Fifth Ave.), a two-story Italian Renaissance-style apartment building, constructed c. 1920.
- 1805 East Fifth Avenue, two identical two-story apartment buildings constructed c. 1915 in the Italian Renaissance Revival style.

== Community ==
The Parkridge Community Organization (PCO) describes Parkridge as an urban neighborhood with approximately 3,500 people living in 1,800 houses. The neighborhood is "racially mixed," at 65% black and 35% white. The neighborhood is home to nine churches and six non-profit organizations.

Caswell Park, Cansler YMCA, John T. O'Connor Senior Center, and Knoxville Municipal Stadium (formerly Bill Meyer Stadium) are located in Parkridge. The larger Chilhowee Park and Zoo Knoxville are located off Magnolia to the east.
