= East Knoxville =

Neighborhood in Tennessee, United States

Coordinates: 35.98117°N 83.90139°W

East Knoxville is the section of Knoxville, Tennessee, USA, that lies east of the city's downtown area. It is concentrated along Magnolia Avenue (US-70/US-11), Martin Luther King, Jr., Boulevard, Dandridge Avenue, and adjacent streets, and includes the neighborhoods of Holston Hills, Parkridge, Chilhowee Park, Morningside, Five Points, and Burlington. East Knoxville is home to Zoo Knoxville, the Knoxville Botanical Garden and Arboretum, and Chilhowee Park.

== History ==
"East Knoxville" traditionally refers to the part of Knoxville east of First Creek (this creek is roughly paralleled by the eastern portion of the Downtown Loop, namely Neyland Drive and James White Parkway). A portion of this area was incorporated as the City of East Knoxville in 1855, though it was annexed by Knoxville in 1868. The advent of streetcars and the development of what is now Chilhowee Park led to the establishment of residential areas in East Knoxville in the late 19th century. Two such residential areas, Park City (Parkridge and surrounding neighborhoods) and Mountain View (Morningside), were incorporated as separate cities in 1907, and annexed by Knoxville in 1917.

Urban renewal projects in Downtown Knoxville in the 1950s and 1960s displaced numerous African American residents, many of whom relocated to East Knoxville. Most East Knoxville neighborhoods remain mixed neighborhoods. The Beck Cultural Exchange Center, one of the primary repositories of black history and culture in East Tennessee, is located on Dandridge Avenue in East Knoxville.

Throughout the late 20th century and early 21st century, the Magnolia Avenue area has been considered a red-light district by residents and the Knoxville Police Department.

Recent initiatives to revitalize East Knoxville have focused on improving Magnolia Avenue and Martin Luther King, Jr., Boulevard, preserving historical buildings, eliminating blight, filling or demolishing vacant buildings, and improving sidewalks.

== See also ==
- Mascot
- Old City
