= Chilhowee Park, Knoxville =

Neighborhood in Knoxville, Tennessee, US

Coordinates: 35.99303°N 83.89115°W

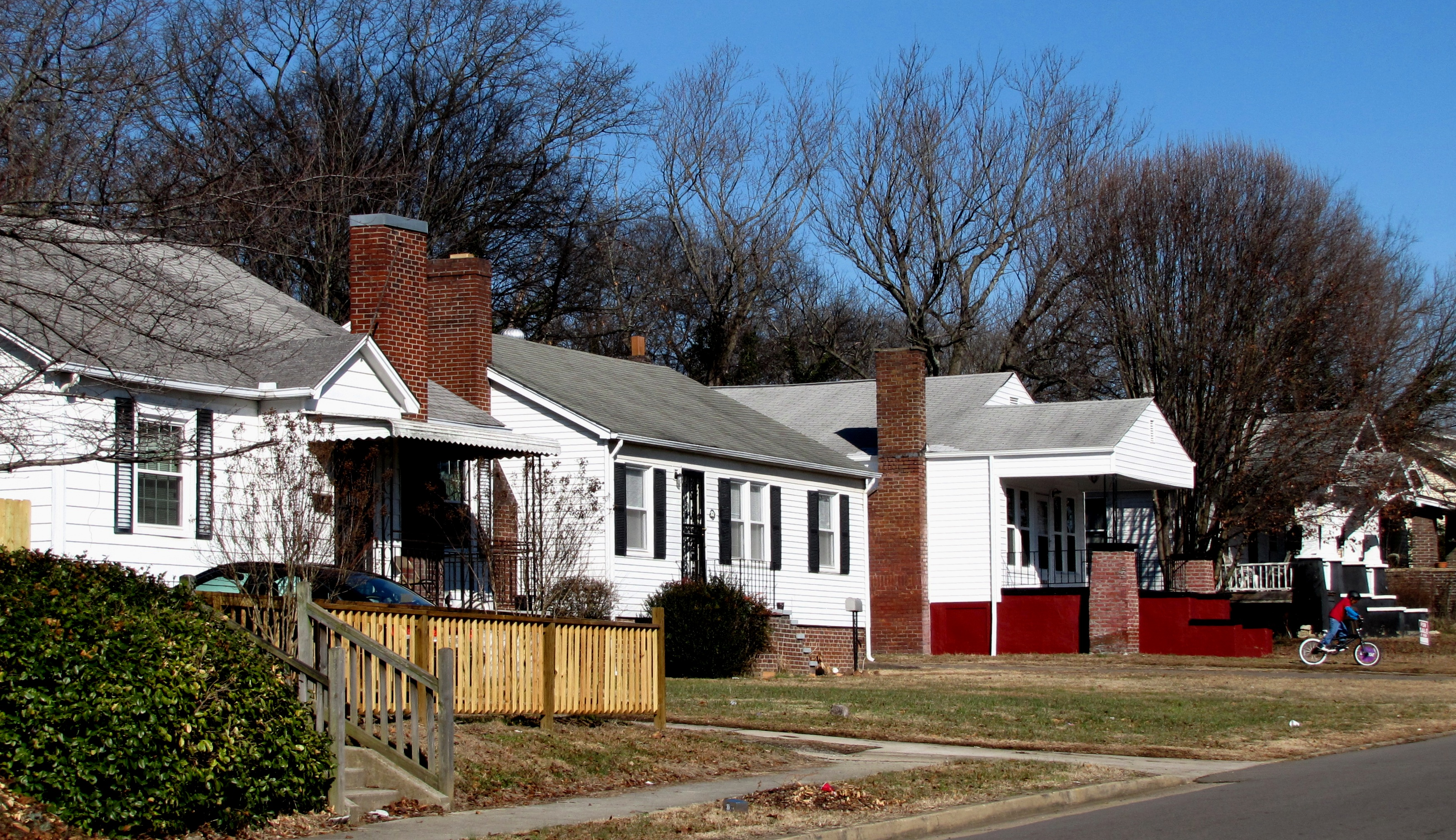
Houses along Woodbine Avenue in Chilhowee Park

Chilhowee Park is a residential neighborhood in Knoxville, Tennessee, United States, located off Magnolia Avenue in the East Knoxville area. Developed as a streetcar suburb in the 1890s, this neighborhood was initially part of Park City, which was incorporated as a separate city in 1907, and annexed by Knoxville in 1917. Chilhowee Park lies adjacent to one of Knoxville's largest municipal parks (also named Chilhowee Park), as well as Zoo Knoxville. The neighborhood contains a notable number of early-20th-century houses.

== Location ==
Chilhowee Park is located in an area roughly bounded by Cherry Street on the west, Magnolia Avenue (US-70/US-11) on the south, Interstate 40 and the zoo on the north, and Chilhowee Park (the park) on the east. The Parkridge neighborhood lies opposite Cherry Street to the west, the Morningside area lies to the south, and the Burlington area lies along Magnolia east of the park. The Knoxville Zoo occupies most of the northern part of the neighborhood, between its residential area and I-40.

== History ==
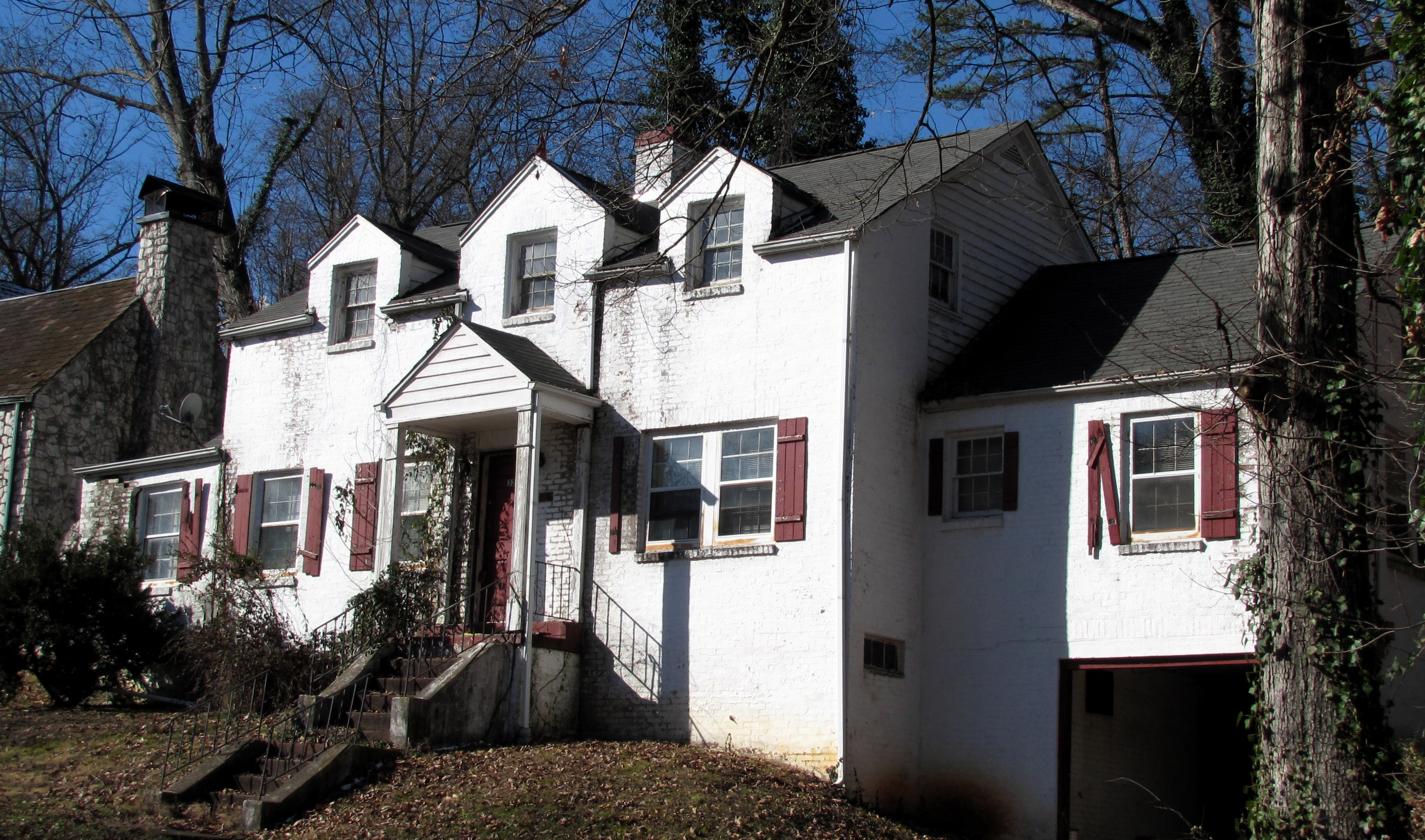
Colonial Revival-style house along Woodbine, built early 1920s

Before the Civil War, what is now Chilhowee Park was primarily part of two large farms, one of which had been established by Revolutionary War veteran Alexander McMillan, and the other by entrepreneur Joseph A. Mabry (1826–1882). The development of the East Knoxville area began in the 1850s, with the incorporation of the City of East Knoxville in 1855 (the city was annexed by Knoxville in 1868) and the establishment of the Shieldstown community along modern Howard Street. During the Civil War, the Chilhowee Park area was used as a mustering grounds.

In 1875, college professor Fernando Cortes Beaman (1836–1911) purchased the McMillan farm, and converted the land into a park (initially Beaman's Park), which by the late 1880s had become a popular gathering place. In 1890, trolley tracks were built along Magnolia, connecting this park with downtown Knoxville. Beaman and several partners formed the Lake Park Springs Company to develop a residential neighborhood adjacent to the park. Initially known as the Lake Park Addition, by the early 1900s it had become "Chilhowee Park."

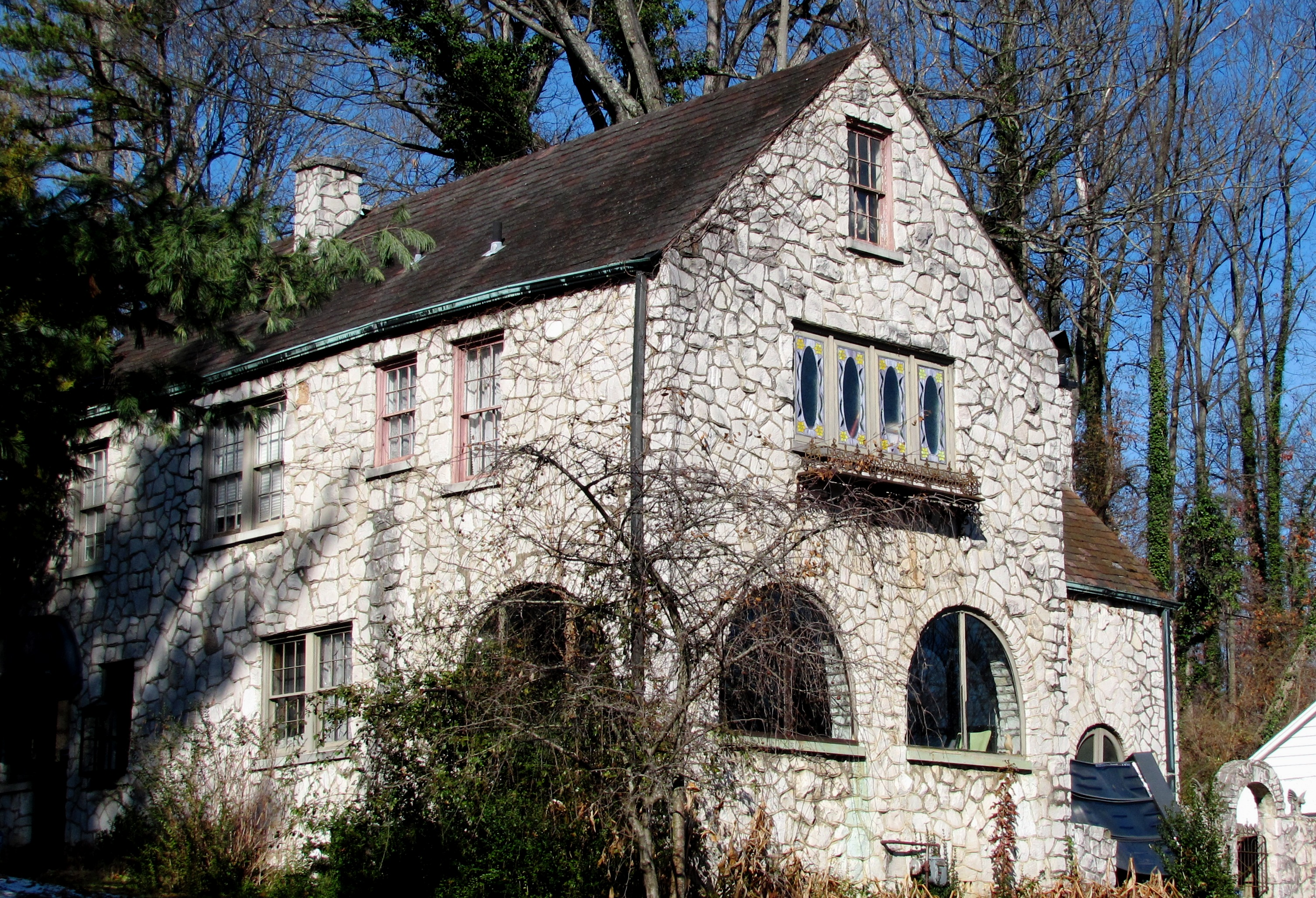
Circa-1925 Tudor Revival-style house on Mary Street, clad in Tennessee marble

In 1891, parts of Woodbine, Jefferson and Fifth Avenue were annexed by Knoxville as the Tenth Ward, but due to a lack of city services, the residents of this ward withdrew from Knoxville in 1893. In 1907, Chilhowee Park, along with what is now Parkridge, incorporated as Park City. The Appalachian Exposition was held at Chilhowee Park in 1910 and again in 1911, and the National Conservation Exposition was held at the park in 1913. Park City was annexed by Knoxville in 1917.

During the 1920s, many of Chilhowee Park's initial residents moved to automobile suburbs on the city's periphery, and the neighborhood evolved into a housing area for railroad workers and employees of the Standard Knitting Mills, a large textile factory located nearby on Washington Avenue. During the early 1940s, Aloysius "Alley" Hartman, a co-inventor of the soft drink Mountain Dew, lived at 3120 Woodbine. In the mid-1960s, a large number of African Americans relocated to Chilhowee Park after urban renewal projects destroyed numerous historically black neighborhoods in the downtown area.

== Chilhowee Park Historic District proposal ==
A nomination for listing on the National Register of Historic Places of a historic district to be named "Chilhowee Park Historic District" was made in 2005 with reference number 00501039. The district was not, however, then listed on the National Register. It was nominated also in 2009.
