= Joseph Knaffl =

American photographer (1861–1938)

- Born: October 9, 1861; Wartburg, Tennessee, United States
- Died: March 23, 1938 (aged 76); Knoxville, Tennessee
- Resting place: Old Gray Cemetery; Knoxville, Tennessee
- Known for: Photography
- Notable work: "Knaffl Madonna" (1899) "The Young St. John" (1903) "The Prophets" (1904)
- Spouse: Lula May Atkin

Joseph Knaffl (October 9, 1861 – March 23, 1938) was an American art and portrait photographer, active in Knoxville, Tennessee, during the late 19th and early 20th centuries. He is best known for his 1899 portrait, "Knaffl Madonna," which has been reprinted thousands of times, and is still used for Hallmark Christmas cards. Knaffl was a partner in two Knoxville studios: Knaffl and Brother, formed in 1884, and Knaffl and Brakebill, formed in 1909.

== Early life and education ==
Knaffl was born in Wartburg, Tennessee, in 1861, the son of Austrian-born physician, Rudolph Knaffl, and his wife, Rosalie. Rudolph Knaffl had been a court physician at the emperor's court in Vienna before moving to the United States in the aftermath of the Revolutions of 1848. After serving as a Union Army physician during the Civil War, Dr. Knaffl moved his family to Knoxville, where he practiced medicine.

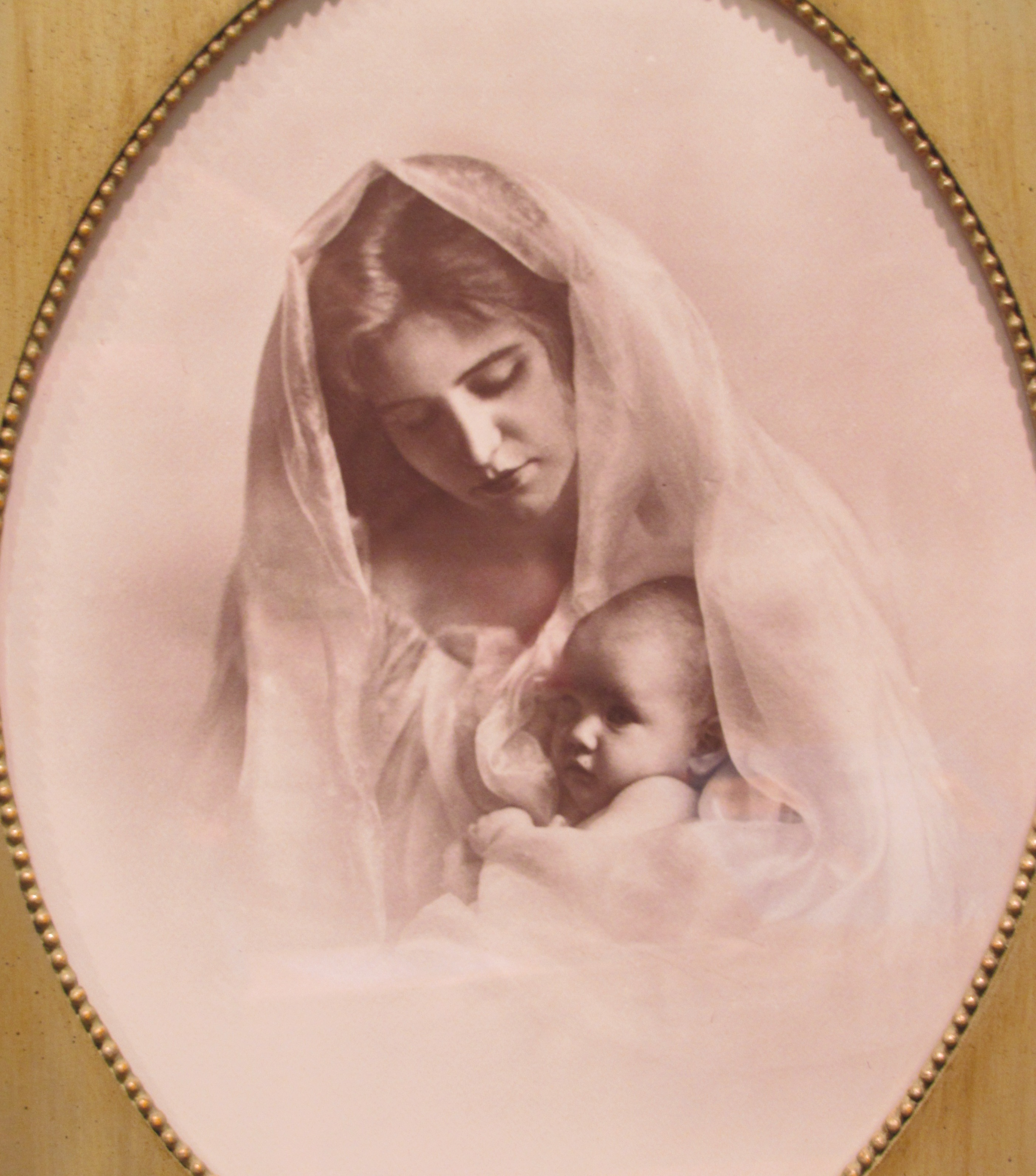
Knaffl's Madonna, 1899

Joseph Knaffl attended schools in Knoxville and Nashville. He learned photography working at the studio of his brother-in-law, early Knoxville portraitist T.M. Schleier.

== Knaffl and Brother ==
In 1884, he and his brother, Charles, formed their own studio, Knaffl and Brother. This studio, which eventually moved into a building on Gay Street, focused primarily on artistic photographs. Following Charles's death in 1904, Knaffl continued running the studio alone or with various partners.

== Knaffl and Brakebill ==
In 1909, Knaffl formed a portrait studio with one of his protégés, James Brakebill (though he continued to manage Knaffl and Brother as a separate studio). Knaffl was in charge of the photography exhibit at the Appalachian Exposition of 1910, and Knaffl and Brakebill provided much of the portrait work for the National Conservation Exposition of 1913. He operated Knaffl and Brother until his death in 1938.

== Works ==
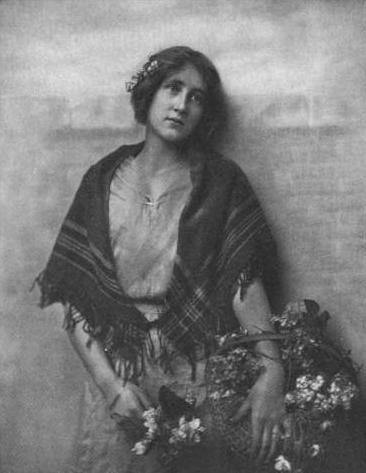
The Flower Seller, c. 1916

Knaffl's early portraits, which were influenced by classical art, were often based on religious iconography, such as "Knaffl Madonna" (1899) and "The Young St. John" (1903). After partnering with Brakebill in 1909, he began doing more character studies, such as "The Flower Seller."

During the mid-1890s, the Knaffls made a series of photographs that poked fun at negative racial stereotypes, such as "A Skin Game" (1896), which depicts three African-American card players cheating at poker. One such Knaffl photograph would later appear as an ironic joke on the cover of an album by jazz saxophonist Lou Donaldson.

Knaffl's best-known photograph, "Knaffl's Madonna" (originally entitled "Madonna and Child"), was exhibited at the Photographers' Association of America convention at Celoron, New York, and was the subject of a Brush and Pencil article written that year by sculptor Lorado Taft. The photograph, which is a representation of Mary holding Jesus, is actually Emma Fanz (the daughter of Knaffl's friend, Knoxville sausage magnate Ignaz Fanz) holding Knaffl's daughter, Josephine. Since Josephine, apparently frightened by the noise of Gay Street, cried continuously, it took three separate shoots to get the image Knaffl wanted.

Knaffl's photographs were featured in magazines such as The Photographic Review, Photo-era Magazine, Photographic Times, Anthony's Photographic Bulletin, and Wilson's Photographic Magazine. Knaffl and Brother often placed first, second or third place in the Southern Division of contests held by the Photographers' Association of America, their primary competitors being fellow Knoxville photographer Frank McCrary (a partner of oil portraitist Lloyd Branson) and the New Orleans–based Moses and Son studio. In 1904, the Knaffl photograph, "The Prophets," won a gold medal at the St. Louis World's Fair.

=== Technique ===
A description accompanying a Knaffl photograph in the 1909 Complete Self-instructing Library of Practical Photography gives some insight into the Knaffls' production process. The photograph was described as having been made in a 20-foot (6.1 m) by 40-foot (12 m) "operating-room," using a "single-slant" light style diffused with white curtains, and a Bausch & Lomb lens. The photograph was recorded on a regular plate "developed in Pyro with no after manipulation."

Further insight into Knaffl's technique is given in a 1913 article in Studio Light magazine, which featured eight Knaffl and Brakebill portraits. The article describes Knaffl's "rather original and interesting" use of a double lighting system— one light providing the bulk of the illumination, and a second light at a right angle to control contrast. The lower portion of the main light was fitted with a casement window to create "home-portrait effect."

== Legacy ==
Knaffl's son, also named Samuel, joined Knaffl and Brother in 1924, and assumed control of the business after his father's death. Samuel Knaffl died in 1969, and the business, which had evolved into a framing gallery on Kingston Pike, passed to his widow, Sarah. It finally closed in 1987. A grandson of Knaffl, Edward Hurst, Jr., was a noted portrait painter in the 1960s and 1970s.

== Family life ==
Knaffl was married to Lula May Atkin, the daughter of Knoxville hotel and real estate magnate, Samuel T. Atkin.

=== Gallery ===
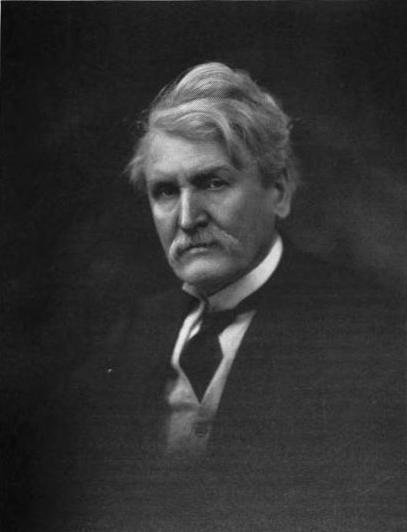

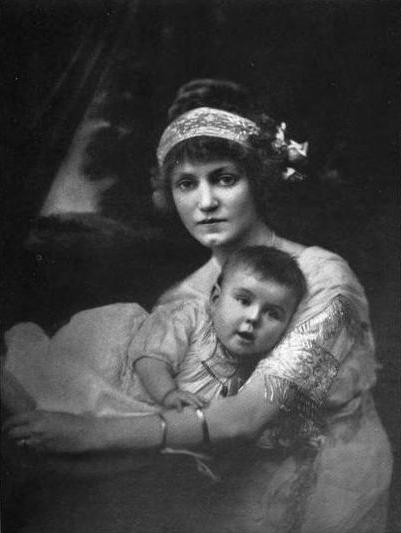

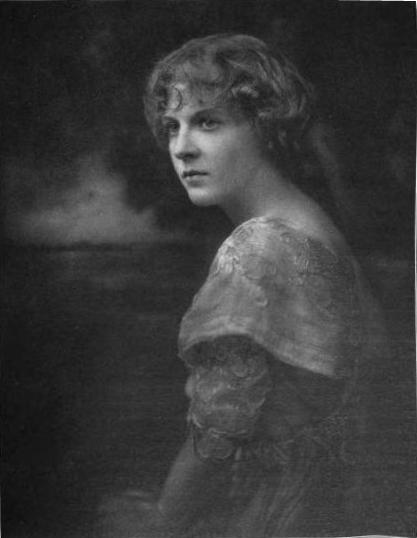

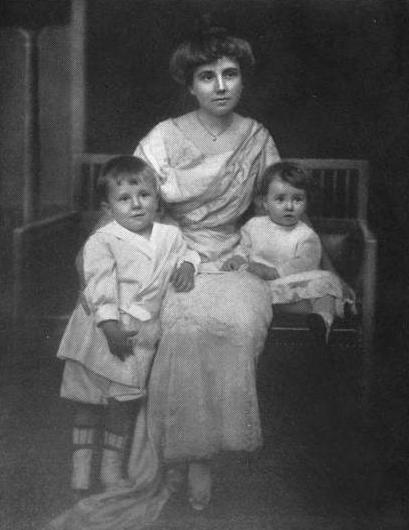
