= Tennessee Valley Fair =

Regional fair in Knoxville, Tennessee

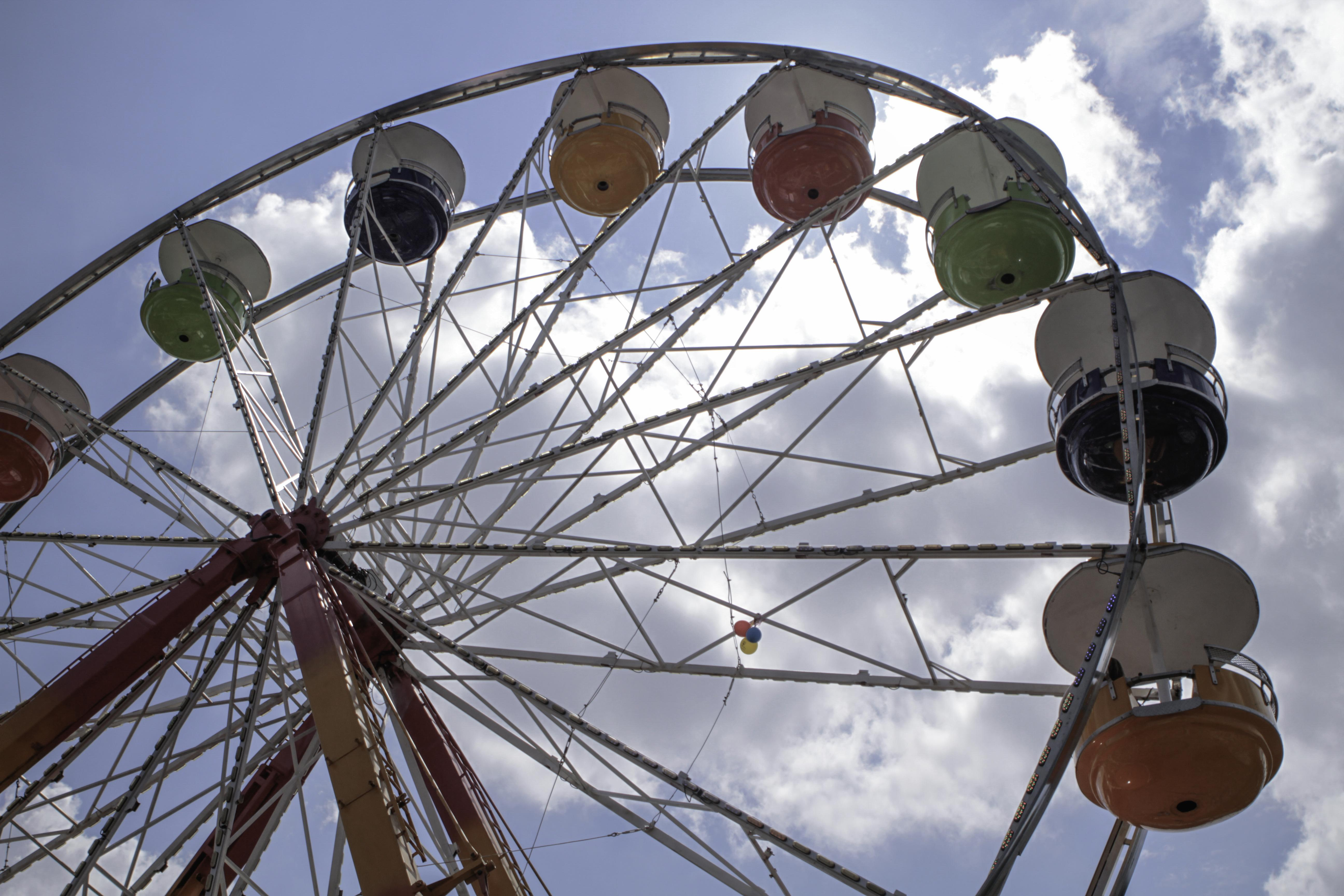
- Ferris wheel at Tennessee Valley Fair, September 2014
- Genre: Regional fair
- Frequency: Annually
- Locations: Knoxville, Tennessee, United States
- Coordinates: 35.9992°N 83.8836°W
- Website: tnvalleyfair.org

The Tennessee Valley Fair (Tennessee Valley Agricultural & Industrial Fair) is an annual regional fair held in Knoxville, Tennessee at Chilhowee Park & Exposition Center. The Tennessee Valley Fair takes place every September and lasts ten days.

== History ==
The precursor to the Tennessee Valley Fair was the Appalachian Exposition of 1910 and 1911. After the success of the two Appalachian Expositions, organizers saw an opportunity for an even larger event, and the National Conservation Exposition was held in 1913. After, the organizers saw a need for a yearly fair and the first East Tennessee Division Fair was held in 1916. The Fair was not held in 1917 or 1918 due to influenza outbreak but began again in 1919. The fair was later rechartered as a non-profit organization and renamed the Tennessee Valley Agricultural and Industrial Fair in 1932 - the 1933 fair was the first Fair operating under the new name. The Fair has been held every year since 1919 except for 1942-1945 & 2020. The Tennessee Valley Fair saw 2020 get cancelled as the COVID-19 pandemic was to blame; the 101st was deferred to 2021.

== Timeline ==
- 1910-1911 Appalachian Exposition
- 1913 National Conservation Exposition
- 1916, 1919–1932 East Tennessee Division Fair
- 1933-1941 Tennessee Valley Agricultural and Industrial Fair
- 1946–2019, 2021– Tennessee Valley Agricultural and Industrial Fair

== Contests ==
4-H, Arts & Crafts, Barn Quilts, Cakes Breads & Pies, Canning, Cheerleading & Dance, Chili Cook-Off, Confections, Cornhole Tournament, Crazy Cakes & Baby Bouquets, Decorated Cakes Cupcakes & Cake Pops, Doll Show, Fairy Garden, FCCLA, FFA, Fine Arts, Flower Show, Giant Growing, Girl Scouts, Graphic Design, Holiday & Special Craft, Honey Show, Horticulture, HOSA, Ice Cream Eating, Jewelry, LEGO Build, LEGO Extravaganza, LEGO SUMO-Bot, Medal of Honor Photography, Needle Work, One-Pot Meal Challenge, Pageants, Photography, Pinterest Interest, Plein Air, Quilting, Robo-Rodeo Robotics, Scarecrow, Scrapbooking & Creative Cards, Skills USA, Student Art, Talent, Vinyl Craft, Woodcarving & Wood Sculpture.

Livestock Catalog: Beef Show, Dairy Goats, Dairy Show, Eastern Region 4-H Junior Dairy Show, Junior Beef Show, Junior Sheep Show, 4-H Invitational Rabbit Show, Poultry & Junior Poultry, Rabbit Show, Sheep Show, Wool Show.
