= Muse Knoxville =

Museum in Tennessee, Knoxville

- Muse Knoxville in 2026
- Established: 1969
- Location: Knoxville
- Coordinates: 35°59′52″N 83°53′08″W
- Type: STEM

Muse Knoxville is a children's STEM museum located in Chilhowee Park in Knoxville, Tennessee, United States. Founded in 1969, it focuses on hands-on, interactive exhibits and features a full-dome planetarium. In 2024, it served nearly 140,000 visitors.

== History ==
In 1960, Student's Museum, Inc. was chartered by Knoxville Junior Academy of Science and the Akima Club at the American Legion Building, 704 State Street. The Student's Museum was built to house scientific exhibits geared to young children, and "to make them more aware of their surroundings and more appreciative of adult museums." Nine years later, in 1969, it was officially granted 501(c)3 non-profit status.

In 1976, the New Student's Museum, designed by local architect Arnold Schwarzbart, opened adjacent to Zoo Knoxville. The new space included an exhibition space, TV production facilities, offices, a student work area, and a new two-story Planetarium.

In 1987, the Student's Museum changed its name to East Tennessee Discovery Center.

In 2011, the M.U.S.E. of Knoxville (Museum of Understanding Science and Exploration of the Arts) was chartered with the goal to "create transformative learning experiences for all children in the Knoxville region."

On August 29, 2013, the M.U.S.E. of Knoxville and East Tennessee Discovery Center vote to merge their non-profit organizations. The merged organization took the name Muse Knoxville. The original master plan aimed to put a new museum in the Knoxville Convention and Exhibition Center, but the museum eventually settled at the former Discovery Center site in Chilhowee Park.

In April 2019, the museum opened Muse at the Mall, a satellite location in West Town Mall, to expand its reach. Due to the COVID-19 pandemic, its closed so the museum could concentrate its efforts on the original location.

In August 2025, the museum announced plans to relocate to the Jacob Building by 2028. The Jacon Building sits across from the museum's current location in Chilhowee Park and will allow the museum to grow from 10,000-square-foot (930 m^{2}) to nearly 57,000-square-foot (5,300 m^{2}).
