= Appalachian Exposition =

Exhibition held in 1910 and 1911 in Knoxville, Tennessee'

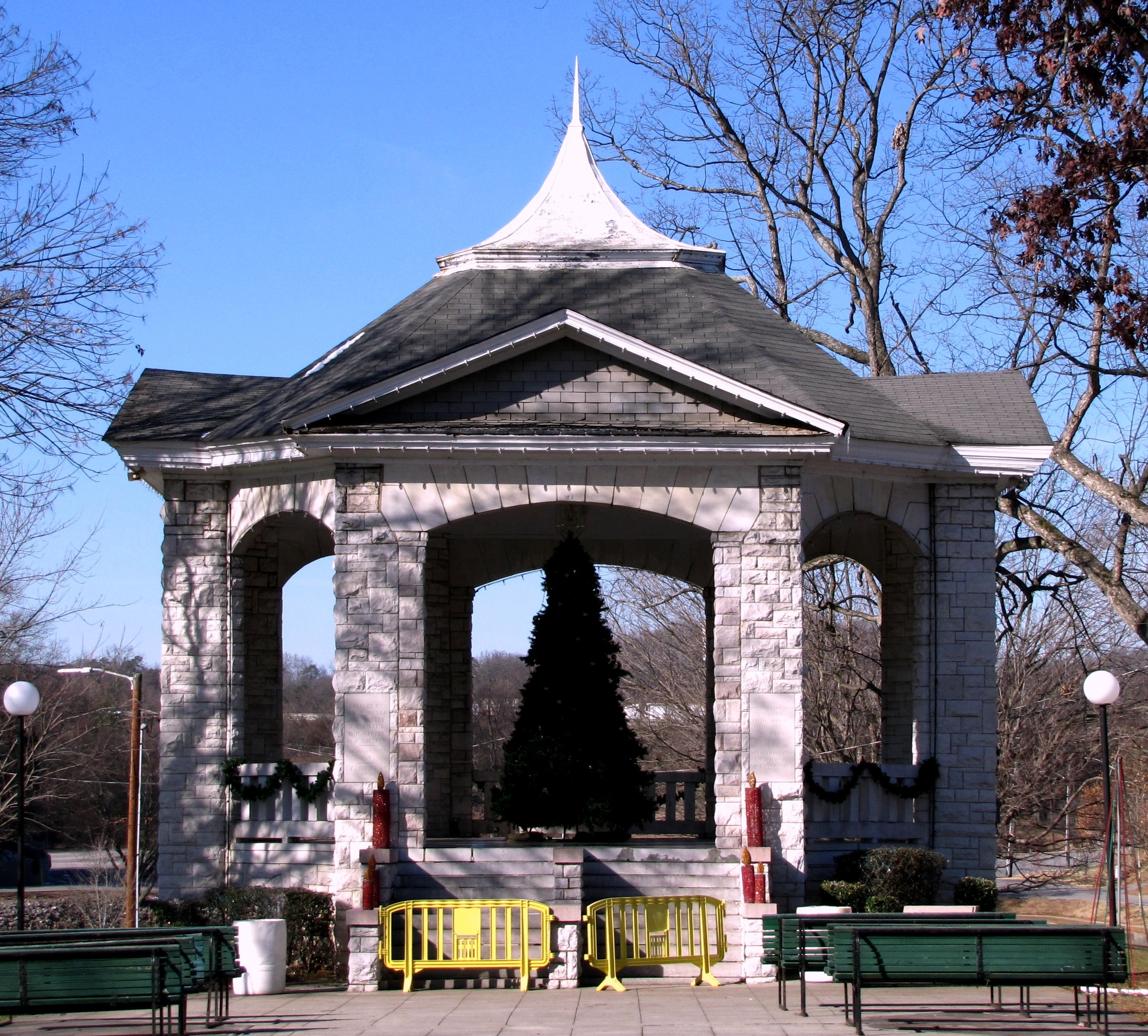
Bandstand built for the Appalachian Exposition in 1910

The Appalachian Exposition, also known as the Appalachian Exhibition, was an event held in 1910 and 1911 in Knoxville, Tennessee's on property (now Chilhowee Park) owned by Knoxville Railway and Light. The park grounds were 65 acres and included two lakes. The exhibitions demonstrated progress in Southern industry. Former president Theodore Roosevelt spoke at the 1910 exposition, and president William Howard Taft spoke in 1911.

The expositions featured a large exhibit hall designed by architect John R. Graf, a Tennessee marble bandstand designed by architect R. F. Graf, and a building constructed by Knoxville College students to exhibit the city's African American history. The expositions saw the first airplane and zeppelin flights in East Tennessee, and helped boost the careers of local artists Lloyd Branson and Catherine Wiley.

== 1910 exposition ==
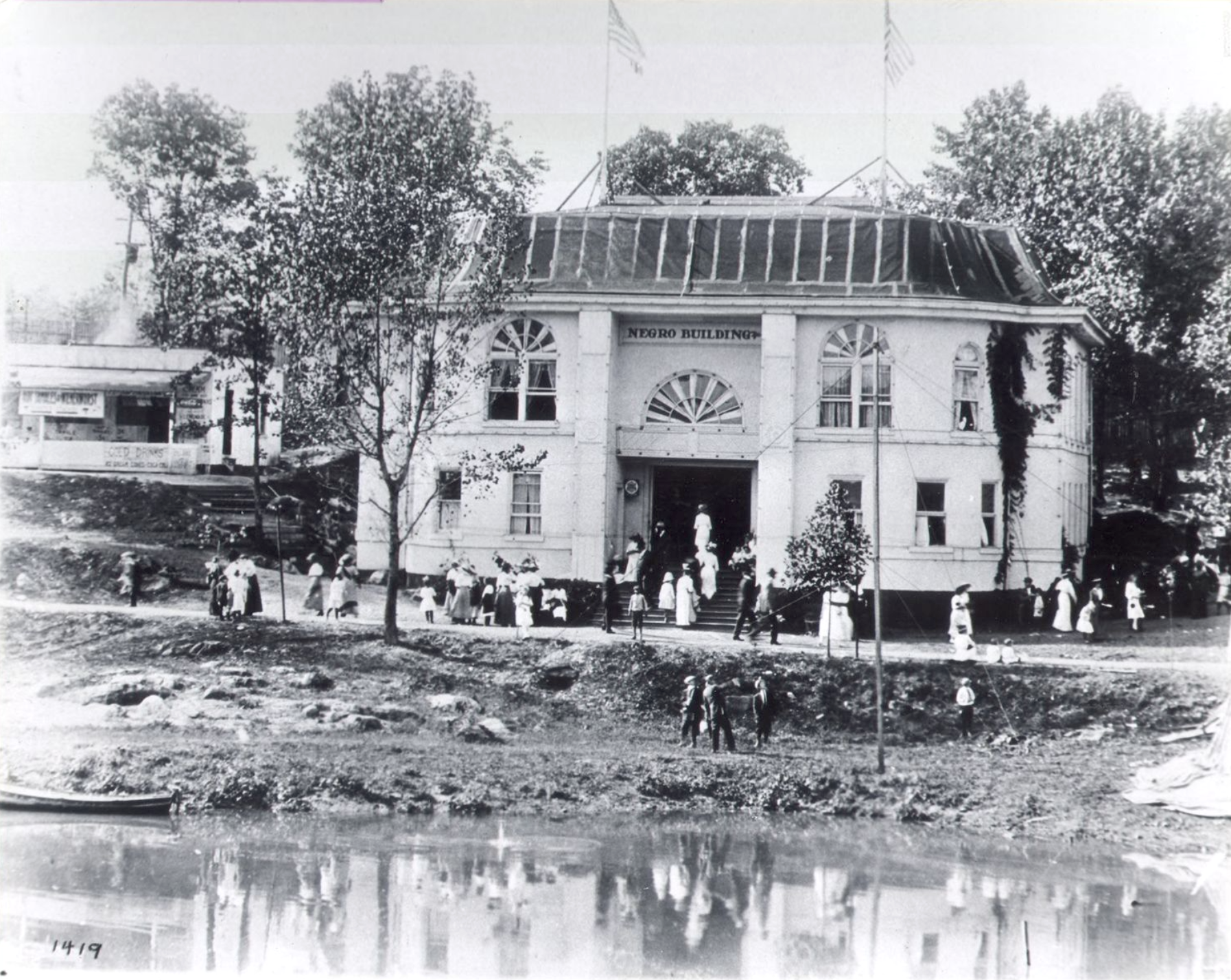
Appalachian Exposition's "Negro Building" (1910)

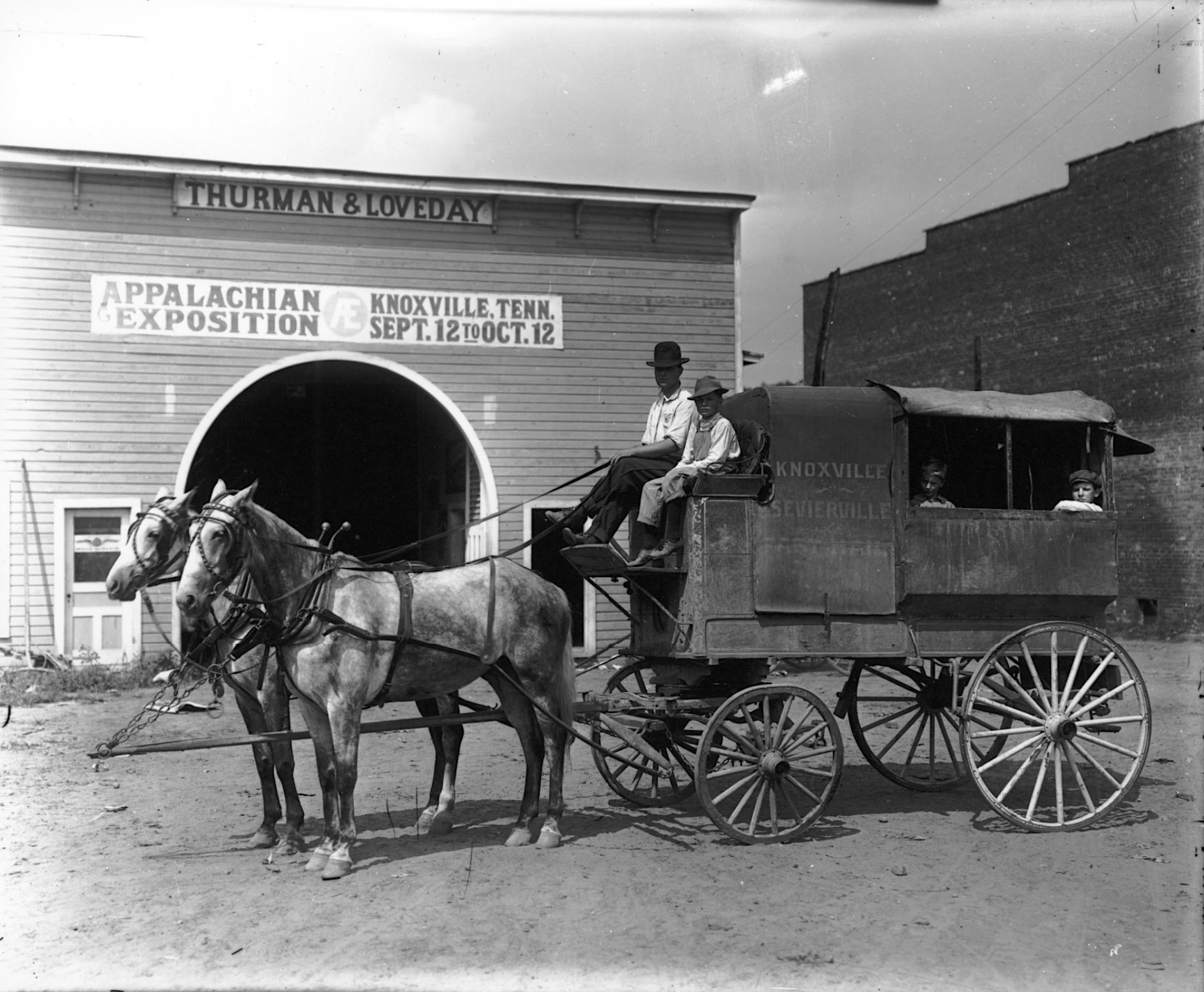
The Thurman & Loveday building with a sign for the Appalachian Exposition, with a horse drawn wagon for mail

William J. Oliver was the exposition's president in 1910. Sara Ward Conley loaned historical materials to be exhibited. R. F. Graf designed the Bandstand and the Liberal Arts Building for the Appalachian Exposition.

In 1910 Cal Johnson cut down the lone tree at his racetrack to allow a plane to land for the Exposition. The artwork of Catherine Wiley was honored at the exhibition. Bertha E. Perrie earned a silver medal, Joseph Knaffl exhibited work, Lloyd Branson's "Hauling Marble" won a gold medal as did Ella Sophonisba Hergesheimer. William Posey Silva also displayed work.

The "Negro Building" at the Appalachian Exposition was praised for its beauty, it was designed by architect John Henry Michael from Knoxville College, with business partner William Stacy, and it was constructed by Knoxville College students. The two story, 6,000 square foot "Negro Building" was a combination of "Oriental" and Modern styles as per the request by the exposition; it sat alongside a lake, with a dramatic double stairway that led to a mezzanine. H. M. Green (also known as Henry Morgan Green), the City Physician for Knoxville, served as the chairman of the "Colored Department" at the Appalachian Exposition.

== 1911 exposition ==
In 1911, over $35,000 was spent by the Appalachian Exposition Association on providing free attractions for the exhibition. In the center of the exhibition grounds, there was a grandstand made of Tennessee marble. The main attractions were the mineral and forest exhibits. Some of the activities held included guest speakers, horse racing, flight performances, and a "Nashville Day."

Lawrence Tyson served as president of the 1911 Exposition. Jane Franklin Hommel served as chair of the Women's Congress of the Appalachian Exposition in 1911.

== Legacy and aftermath ==
The National Conservation Exposition succeeded the exposition in 1913, and a few years later the predecessor to the Tennessee Valley Fair followed with an annual event.

The East Tennessee Historical Society's Museum of East Tennessee History has memorabilia from the event.
