= T. M. Schleier =

American photographer and diplomat (1832–1908)

T.M. Schleier
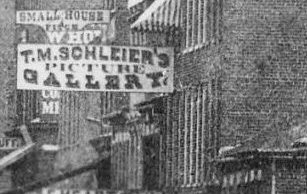
- Schleier's gallery in Knoxville (1869)
- Born: April 20, 1832; Prussia
- Died: December 13, 1908 (aged 76); New York, New York, United States
- Known for: Photography
- Spouse: Caroline E. Knaffl (m. 1862)

Theodore M. Schleier (April 20, 1832 – December 13, 1908) was a Prussian-born American photographer, inventor, and diplomat, active primarily in the southeastern United States in the latter half of the 19th century. While operating from a studio in Nashville, Tennessee, he helped document life in the city during the Civil War. He later moved to Knoxville, Tennessee, where he captured some of the city's earliest photographs. His inventions include an early artificial lighting system for photography studios.

Schleier was a delegate to the 1872 Republican National Convention, and served as U.S. Consul to Amsterdam from 1890 to 1893.

== Life ==
After immigrating to the United States from his native Prussia, Schleier initially settled in New York, where he presumably learned the burgeoning photography trade. By the late 1850s, he had moved to New Orleans, where he operated a studio on Chartres Street. In 1857, Schleier filed a complaint against rival New Orleans photographer James Andrews (1829–1863), stating that Andrews had busted open the door to his studio, ejected him from the studio with a fireplace poker, and destroyed his photographic equipment "with a view of preventing him from pursuing his regular business." In spite of this attack, Schleier had opened a new ambrotype studio on Camp Street by the Summer of 1857.

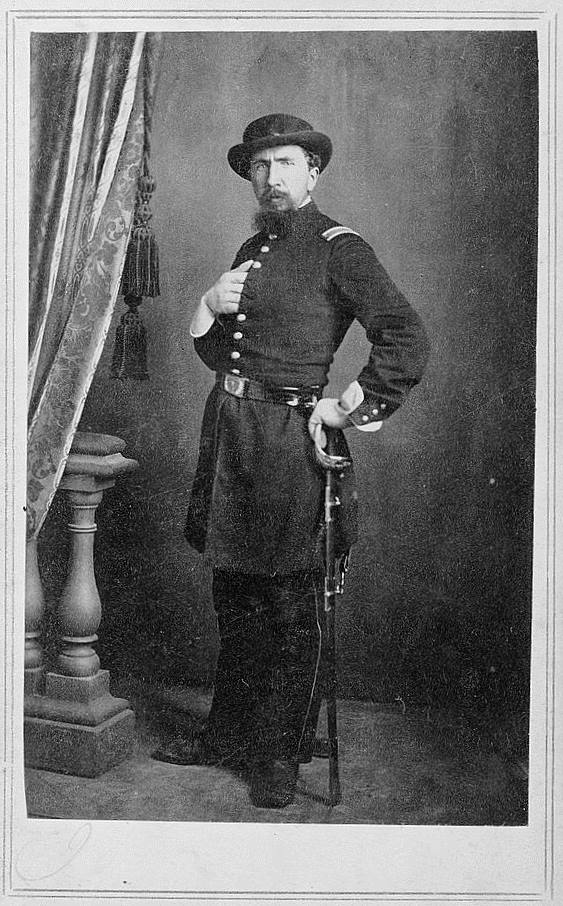
Carte de visite of a Union soldier, created by Schleier during the Union occupation of Nashville

In 1859, Schleier moved to Nashville to work in the Southern Photographic Temple of Fine Arts, a studio and gallery on Deaderick Street operated by fellow Prussian immigrant Carl Giers (1828–1877). An ad for the studio described Schleier as "one of the best Photographers and practical Chemists in the country." By 1863, Schleier was running his own studio at the corner of Cherry and Union streets, in addition to the Giers location. This studio specialized in cartes de visite, and advertised to the soldiers of the Union forces occupying the city. In April 1862, Schleier married Catherine Knaffl, a daughter of prominent Austrian-born physician Rudolph Knaffl, who was serving as a surgeon in the Union Army.

Schleier opened a branch gallery in Knoxville, Tennessee, in early 1864. In 1867, he relocated to the city and established a large studio and gallery on Gay Street. This gallery opened to great fanfare in June 1867, with music provided by the Knoxville Brass Band, and ice cream and drinks served by prominent German-American baker Peter Kern. A popular figure in the city, Schleier swept the photography prizes at the city's Eastern Division Fair in October 1871, and won an award for "best comic mask" at a German-American masquerade ball in February 1872.

In 1870, Schleier was indicted for ignoring a new state law requiring photographers to obtain a license and pay an annual privilege tax. Schleier's attorney, German immigrant and future North Knoxville mayor Louis Gratz, argued the law was unconstitutional because it discriminated against photographers living in larger cities by charging them a higher tax. While the circuit court agreed and threw out the charges, the Tennessee Supreme Court overturned this decision and reinstated the indictment. The court reasoned that photographers living in larger cities were free to move to smaller to cities to avoid the higher tax, and therefore the law was not discriminatory.

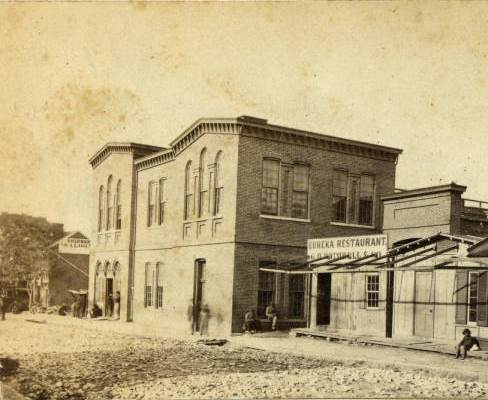
Schleier's photograph of College Street in Nashville, c. 1865

Schleier received several patents for various inventions in the 1870s. He and his father-in-law, Rudolph Knaffl, patented a fan for rocking chairs in 1870. Schleier received a patent for a new type of camera stand in 1872, and for a new type of mustard pot the following year. In late 1872, Schleier was awarded a patent for a brick cleaning machine, which he had exhibited at Knoxville's Eastern Division Fair that October. He toured the Eastern United States giving demonstrations of this machine in November and December 1872, and spent the early part of 1873 in Boston trying to arrange for the machine's manufacture and distribution.

In 1871, Schleier ran unsuccessfully for a seat on Knoxville's Board of Aldermen, campaigning primarily as an advocate for the establishment of free schools. Though nominally non-partisan, Schleier was endorsed by the Knoxville Chronicle, the city's primary Republican mouthpiece. Schleier was a member of the Tennessee delegation at the 1872 Republican National Convention in Philadelphia, and the Knox County delegation at the 1872 Tennessee Republican Party convention in Nashville. During this same period, he helped establish Knoxville's Board of Trade. Schleier was elected to Knoxville's Board of Aldermen in 1877, though he served just one term.

Schleier moved back to Nashville in 1880, and would operate from a studio on North Cherry Street for the remainder of the decade. At the Photographers Association of America's second annual convention in 1881, Schleier was elected one of the convention's vice presidents, and chaired the Committee on Dry Plates. The September 27, 1890, issue of Anthony's Photographic Bulletin described Schleier as "one of the veteran photographers of the United States."

In September 1890, Schleier was appointed United States Consul to Amsterdam by President Benjamin Harrison. Among his various reports, Schleier noted relatively low numbers of vagrants in the Netherlands due to social programs established by the government, church and private charities. He advised against building factories in the country due to high taxes and a lack of natural resources. Following Harrison's defeat in the 1892 presidential election, Schleier was recalled by the new Democratic administration.

Schleier died in New York City on December 13, 1908. His daughter Matilda worked as a professional photographer in the late 19th century. Schleier's brothers-in-law, Joseph Knaffl and Charles Knaffl, learned the photography trade while working in his studio, and established their own gallery in Knoxville in the mid-1880s.

== Works ==
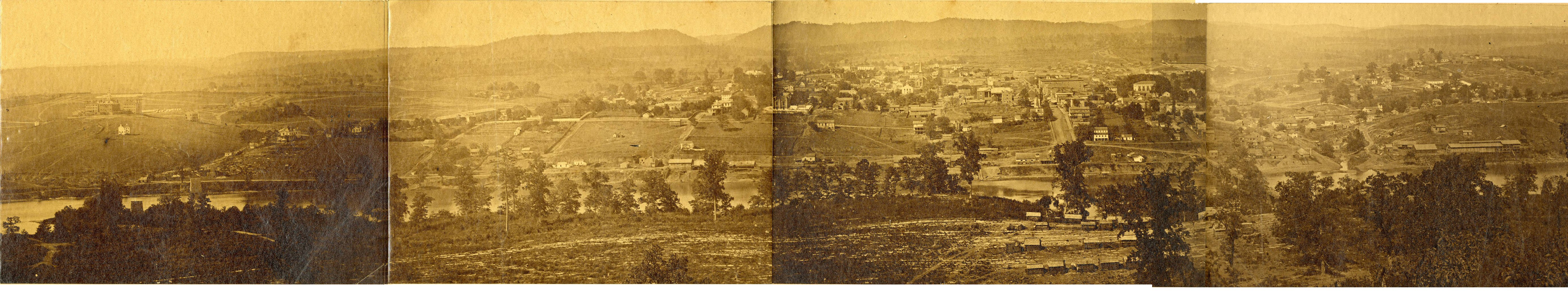
Schleier's panaoramic of Knoxville, 1865

At various times during his career, Schleier specialized in ambrotypes, cartes de visite, and cabinet cards. By 1863, he was using a "multiplying camera" designed by Simon Wing that utilized movable lenses to produce a popular type of photograph known as a "gem." His branch studio in Knoxville, which opened in 1864, offered "photographs, cartes de visite and stereotypes." His main Knoxville studio, which opened in 1867, specialized in ambrotypes, pearl miniatures, and photographs. Schleier partnered with rising Knoxville painter Lloyd Branson to create several "photo-crayon portraits" which were exhibited at 1875 Eastern Division Fair. In 1880, Schleier's Nashville gallery offered "artotypes" (a type of photograph created using ink) and "chromotypes" (colored photographs).

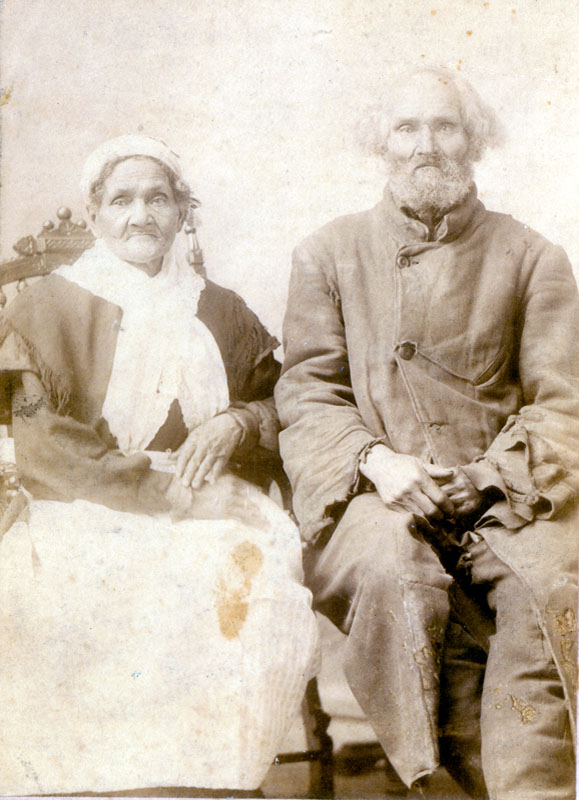
Aaron and Hannah Jackson, former slaves of Andrew Jackson, photographed by Schleier in 1865

The occupation of Nashville by the Union Army in March 1862 brought about the "photographic documentation of the town on an unprecedented scale." Schleier and federal photographer George N. Barnard were the two most active photographers in the city during this period. Places and buildings photographed by Schleier during the war include the railroad bridge over the Cumberland River, Morgan Park, the Tennessee State Capitol, the tomb of James K. Polk, the Planters Hotel, and the original Elm Street Methodist Church (flanked at the time by federal barracks). He also created carte de visite photographs for soldiers stationed in the city, including members of the all-German 32nd Indiana Infantry Regiment.

Schleier's early photographs of Knoxville include an 1865 panoramic of the city from the Civil War-era Fort Stanley (which stood atop a hill in South Knoxville), and at least two photographs of East Tennessee University (the forerunner of the University of Tennessee). During the 1870s, he produced stereo cards depicting various places in East Tennessee, including the Montvale Springs resort at the edge of the Great Smoky Mountains, and the remote Ocoee River Valley in southeastern Tennessee.

During the 1880s, Schleier's studio sold numerous cabinet cards, a type of photograph that had largely replaced the carte de visite as the most popular form of portraiture. Prominent individuals for whom Schleier created cabinet cards included President James Garfield, and Lakota chiefs Crow Dog, Spotted Tail and Red Cloud. He photographed the upper Caney Fork Valley in 1883, and provided portraits for the American Institute of Architects convention in Nashville in 1885.

In 1883, Schleier installed an early artificial lighting system in his Nashville studio with the help of T. P. Keck of the city's Brush Electric Light Company. This system consisted of two arc lights placed in the middle of a white parabolic reflector that measured 6 feet (1.8 m) in diameter. The lights and reflector were suspended from the ceiling and operated with pulleys. The system could generate 2,000 candlepower of light for a single photograph.

Schleier's photographs are included in the collections of the George Eastman House, the American Museum of Natural History, the Tennessee State Library and Archives, the Calvin M. McClung Historical Collection (Knox County, Tennessee), and the University of Tennessee.

=== Gallery ===
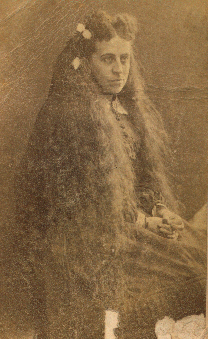
Unidentified Knoxville woman

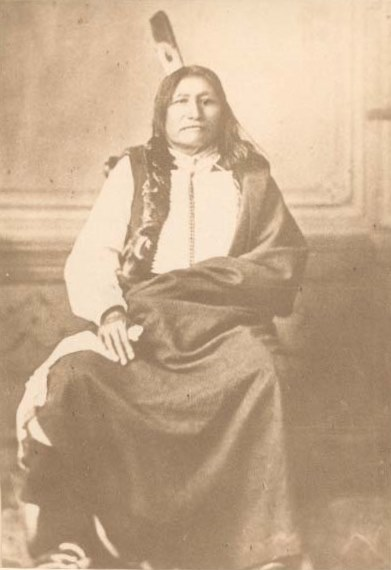
Spotted Tail

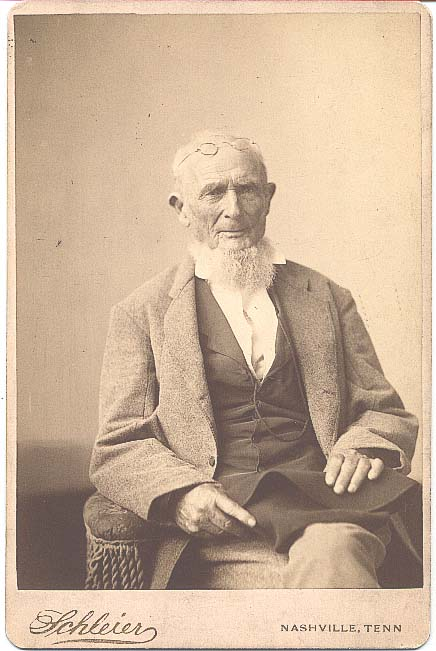
Francis Rogan

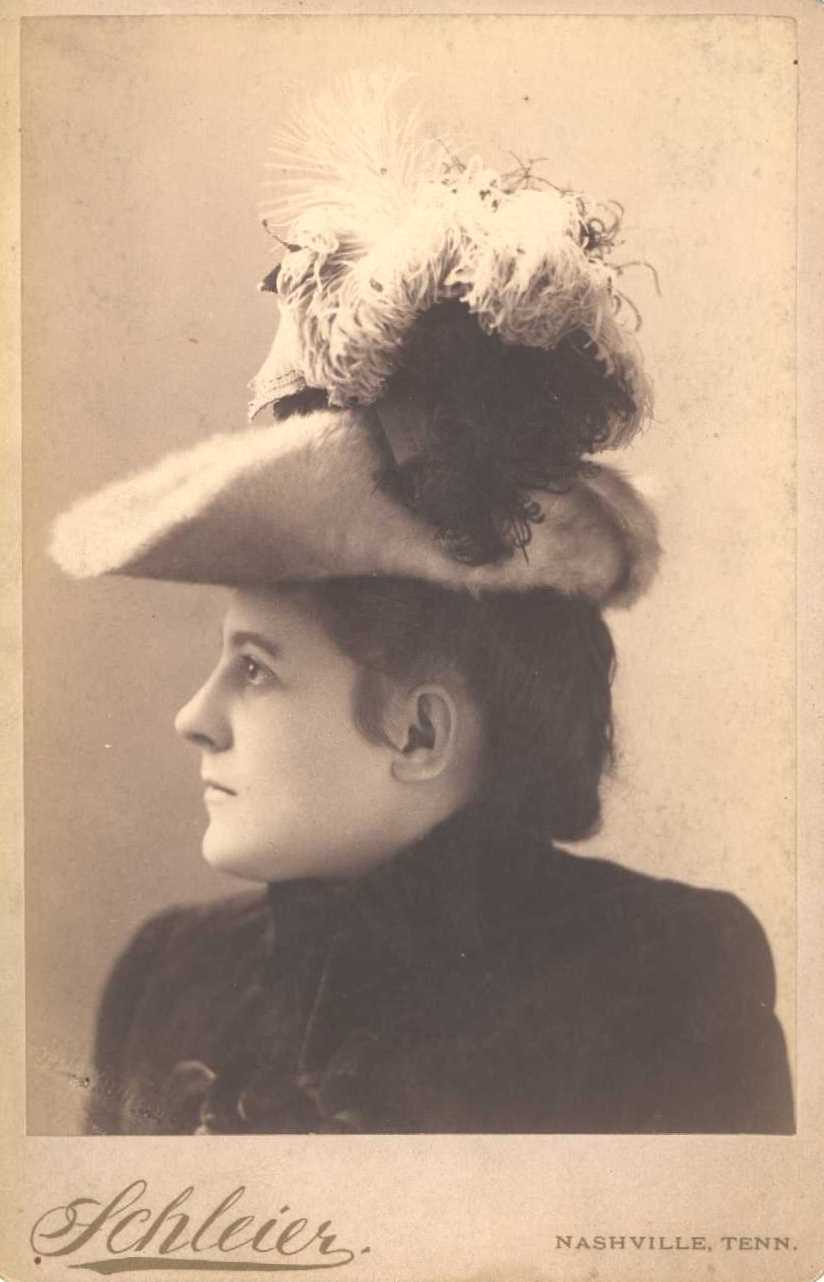
Elizabeth Fraser Price
