= Flag of Knoxville, Tennessee =

City flag

City of Knoxville
- Use: Small vexillological symbol or pictogram in black and white showing the different uses of the flag
- Proportion: 3:5
- Adopted: 1896
- Design: The upper section begins with a blue square followed by horizontal bars of white and black. The lower section contains a red square also followed by horizontal bars of black and white. In the middle section of white, a golden winged wheel is emblazoned with the shield of the city. The escutcheon is supported by a sheaf of corn and a sheaf of wheat. The year 1791 appears below the shield and a crest of nine gold stars surmounts it.
- Designed by: Lloyd Branson

The city flag of Knoxville, Tennessee was officially adopted by municipal ordinance on October 16, 1896. It is the third oldest official city flag in the United States and the oldest flag of any state or city governmental entity in Tennessee.

== Significance ==
Knoxville was the third city in the United States to officially adopt a flag to represent its municipality. Through an official ordinance on March 27, 1895, Philadelphia, Pennsylvania, established the first city flag in America. Cleveland, Ohio, followed with the second city flag in the U.S. on February 21, 1896, and Knoxville created the third flag on October 16, 1896, becoming the oldest municipal flag in Tennessee.

The city's flag existed one year before Tennessee's first official state flag. The shield found inside the flag's "winged wheel" serves as the basis for Knoxville's official seal.

== History ==
The creation of the Knoxville flag is closely tied to the Tennessee Centennial and International Exposition. As citizens began reflecting on the state's accomplishments and its survival after the American Civil War, persons developed ways to express their local community's pride.

Horace van Deventer, a Knoxville attorney, suggested the idea of creating a city flag to the Chamber of Commerce in 1896 in order to symbolize Knoxville. The Chamber then sponsored a nationwide competition for the flag's design. Lloyd Branson, a Knoxville painter professionally trained at the National Academy of Design in New York City and through further study in Paris, won the contest and a cash award of $100. City Council accepted Branson's design and on October 16, 1896, passed City Ordinance Number 958 entitled "An Ordinance Establishing a Flag, Colors, and Coat of Arms for the City of Knoxville and Regulating the Use and Display Thereof."

The Chamber of Commerce had a flag sown together and on October 22, 1896, presented the city's mayor with its first Knoxville flag. This official ceremony occurred during the three-day long Manufacturers and Merchants Street Fair. Joshua Caldwell, chair of the Chamber of Commerce, conferred the flag to Mayor S. G. Heiskell. An account of this presentation event was printed in the Morning Tribune on October 22, 1896, "The City Flag Now Floats to the Breeze from the City Hall."

The Knoxville flag was flown during the Tennessee Centennial, which occurred between May 1 and October 31, 1897, in Nashville. Although it was a year late, this event celebrated the 100th anniversary of Tennessee's entry into the union in 1796. On April 12, 1941, during the year when Knoxvillians were celebrating the 150th anniversary of the city's founding, City Council and Mayor Fred Allen reaffirmed the flag's 1896 design with two changes: the date was changed to 1791 to properly reflect the year of Knoxville's founding, and the locomotive engine depicted on the flag was to resemble The General, which in 1941 was located at the Chattanooga Union Depot.

== Symbolism ==
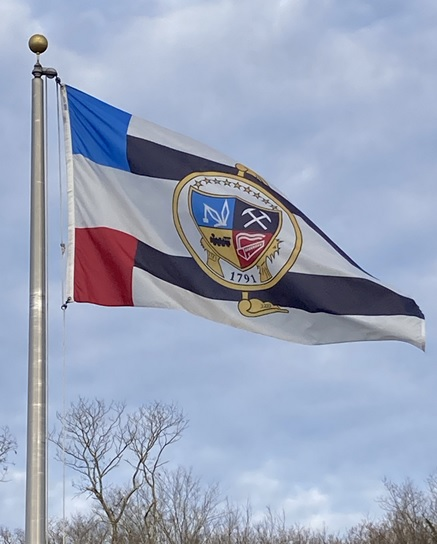
The Flag of Knoxville, Tennessee (Third Oldest City Flag in the U.S.)

In proportion, the flag is six feet on the pole length and nine feet on the fly length and is divided into three equal horizontal divisions. In the upper pole corner is a two-foot canton of azure blue representing loyalty. In the lower pole corner is a like canton of red signifying bravery. The entire center division is white denoting faith. From the blue and red cantons, running parallel with the fly of the flag, are two equal size stripes of black and white representing coal and marble, respectively. The stripes running from the blue canton are white above and black below. The stripes running from the red canton are black above and white below.

In the approximate center of the flag is a Golden Wheel of Progress which extends well into the two black stripes. Within this winged wheel is the quartered shield (i.e., the coat of arms or seal) of Knoxville which is surmounted by nine gold stars representing the nine wards of the city in 1896 when the flag was adopted. The shield is supported by a sheaf of wheat and a shock of corn which are in gold and are emblematic of agriculture. Directly under the shield are the black numerals 1791 denoting the year Knoxville was founded.

In the quartered shield is an azure blue field (upper left) emblazoned with a white derrick representing marble; a black field (upper right) emblazoned with crossed, gold colored picks representing various types of mining; a gold field (lower left) emblazoned with a black railroad engine representing transportation or commerce; and a red field (lower right) emblazoned with a neutral colored factory representing manufacturing.
