= Catherine Wiley =

American painter

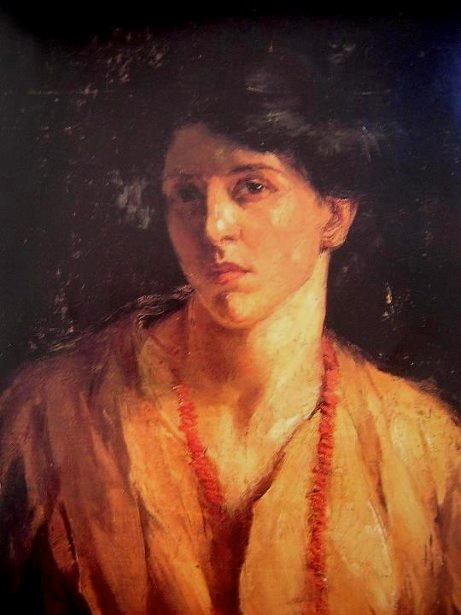
- Self-portrait, 1910s
- Born: Anna Catherine Wiley; January 18, 1879; Coal Creek, Tennessee
- Died: May 16, 1958 (aged 79); Knoxville, Tennessee
- Education: University of Tennessee; Art Students League of New York
- Known for: Painting

Anna Catherine Wiley (January 18, 1879 – May 16, 1958) was an American artist active primarily in the early twentieth century. After training with the Art Students League of New York and receiving instruction from artists such as Lloyd Branson and Frank DuMond, Wiley painted a series of impressionist works that won numerous awards at expositions across the Southern United States, and have since been displayed in museums such as the Metropolitan Museum of Art and the Morris Museum of Art. In 1926, Wiley was institutionalized after suffering a mental breakdown, and never painted again.

== Life ==
Wiley was born in Coal Creek, Tennessee (modern Rocky Top), the daughter of Edwin Floyd Wiley and Mary McAdoo Wiley. She was the granddaughter of prominent attorney and businessman, William Gibbs McAdoo, Sr., and niece of U.S. Treasury Secretary William Gibbs McAdoo, Jr. Her father worked in the coal mining industry, but in 1882 the family moved to Knoxville (their house on Laurel Avenue still stands).

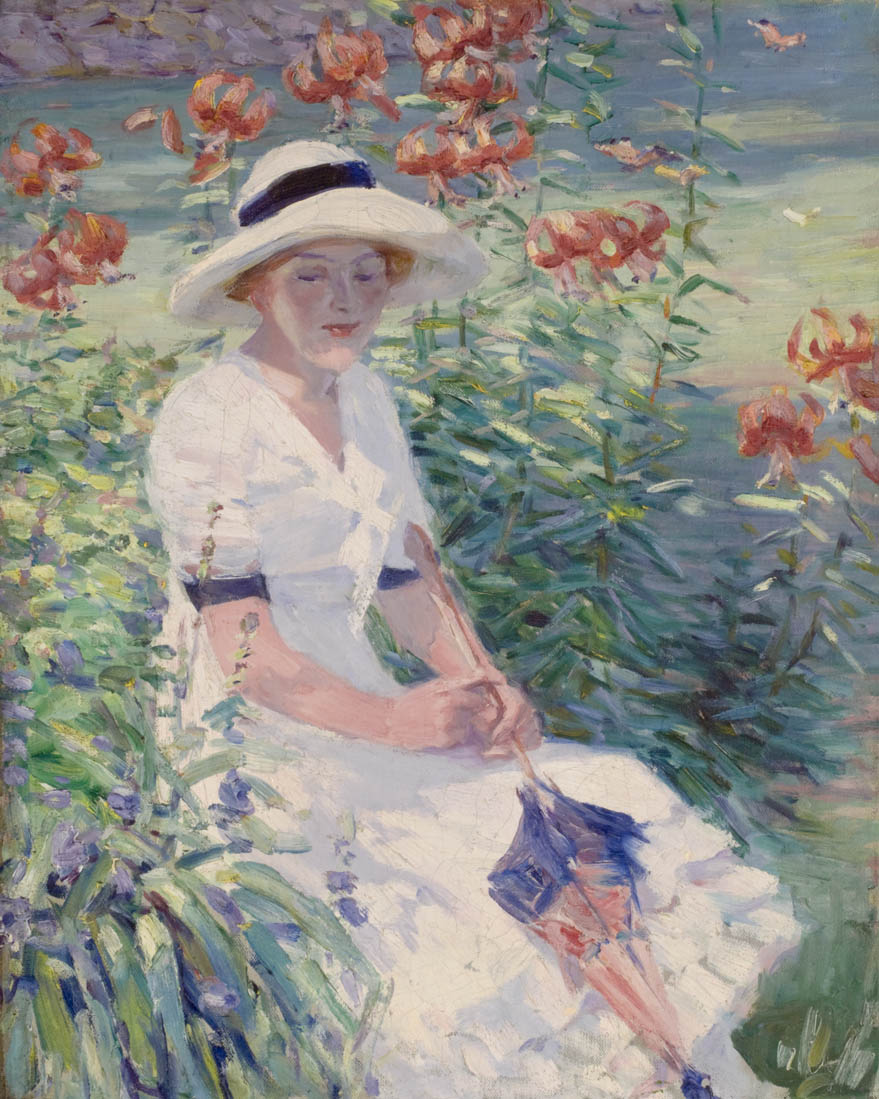
Lady with Parasol (1915)

In the mid-1890s, Wiley attended the University of Tennessee, where she gained initial recognition for some illustrations she had created for the school's yearbook. She moved to New York in 1903 to study with the Art Students League, and received extensive instruction from impressionist Frank DuMond (1865–1951). Her time in New York exposed her to a variety of artists and art movements, namely the Ash Can School, the French Barbizon school, and the works of impressionist William Merritt Chase, all of which influenced her later work.

In 1905, after a brief stay at Chase's New York School of Art, Wiley returned to Knoxville to teach art at the University of Tennessee. She continued to receive instruction from long-time Knoxville painter Lloyd Branson, and quickly became a leading figure in the city's art circle. In 1910, Wiley captured the award for "Most Meritorious Collection" at Knoxville's Appalachian Exposition, and chaired the Fine Arts Department for the city's 1913 National Conservation Exposition. In subsequent years, Wiley consistently won the best painter award at various regional exhibitions, and her work was exhibited at the National Academy of Design, the Pennsylvania Academy of the Fine Arts, and the Cincinnati Art Museum, among other places.

Following the deaths of her father (in 1919) and Branson (in 1925), Wiley suffered a mental breakdown from which she never recovered, and was institutionalized until her death in 1958. She is buried in Knoxville's Old Gray Cemetery. Wiley's sister, Eleanor McAdoo Wiley (1876–1977), was also a noted regional artist.

In January 2012, an untitled 1913 painting by Wiley sold for $107,000 at an auction in Knoxville. The painting was purchased by the Knoxville Museum of Art. In November 2012, the Knoxville Museum of Art and Knox County's Calvin M. McClung Historical Collection pooled their resources to purchase another Wiley painting, entitled "Morning Milking Time," for $77,000.

== Works ==
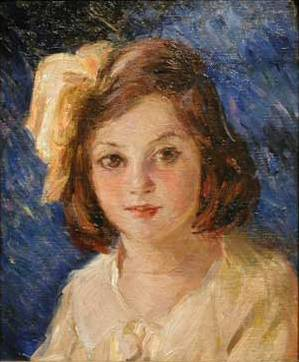
Portrait of Catharine Gaut Burton (ca. 1914)

Wiley has been described as Knoxville's "one noted impressionist." Like many impressionists during this period, she was influenced by the work of French painter Édouard Manet. Her best-known works tend to depict women and interiors, and are characterized by vivid color and brushstroke. Her style drifted toward abstract impressionism later in her career.

The Calvin M. McClung Historical Collection (a division of the Knox County Public Library system) owns the largest collection of Wiley's works, with more than three dozen paintings, about a dozen drawings, and her scrapbooks. Several of the McClung Collection's paintings are on display at the East Tennessee History Center in Knoxville. The Knoxville Museum of Art owns three Wiley paintings and four drawings. Wiley's work has been displayed in various museums across the country, including New York's Metropolitan Museum of Art, the Morris Museum of Art in Augusta, Georgia, the Charleston Renaissance Gallery, and the Greenville Museum of Art in Greenville, South Carolina.

=== List of selected works ===
- Artist's Mother Before a Window (n.d.)
- Haystacks (n.d.)
- Landscape with Gazebo (n.d.)
- Girl in Blue (1907)
- Willow Pond (1914)
- A Sunlit Afternoon (c. 1915)
- Morning (1921)
- Tennessee Landscape (c. 1921)
- By the Arbor (1923)

== See also ==
- Adelia Armstrong Lutz
