= Chilhowee Park =

Public park, fairgrounds and exhibition venue in Tennessee, US

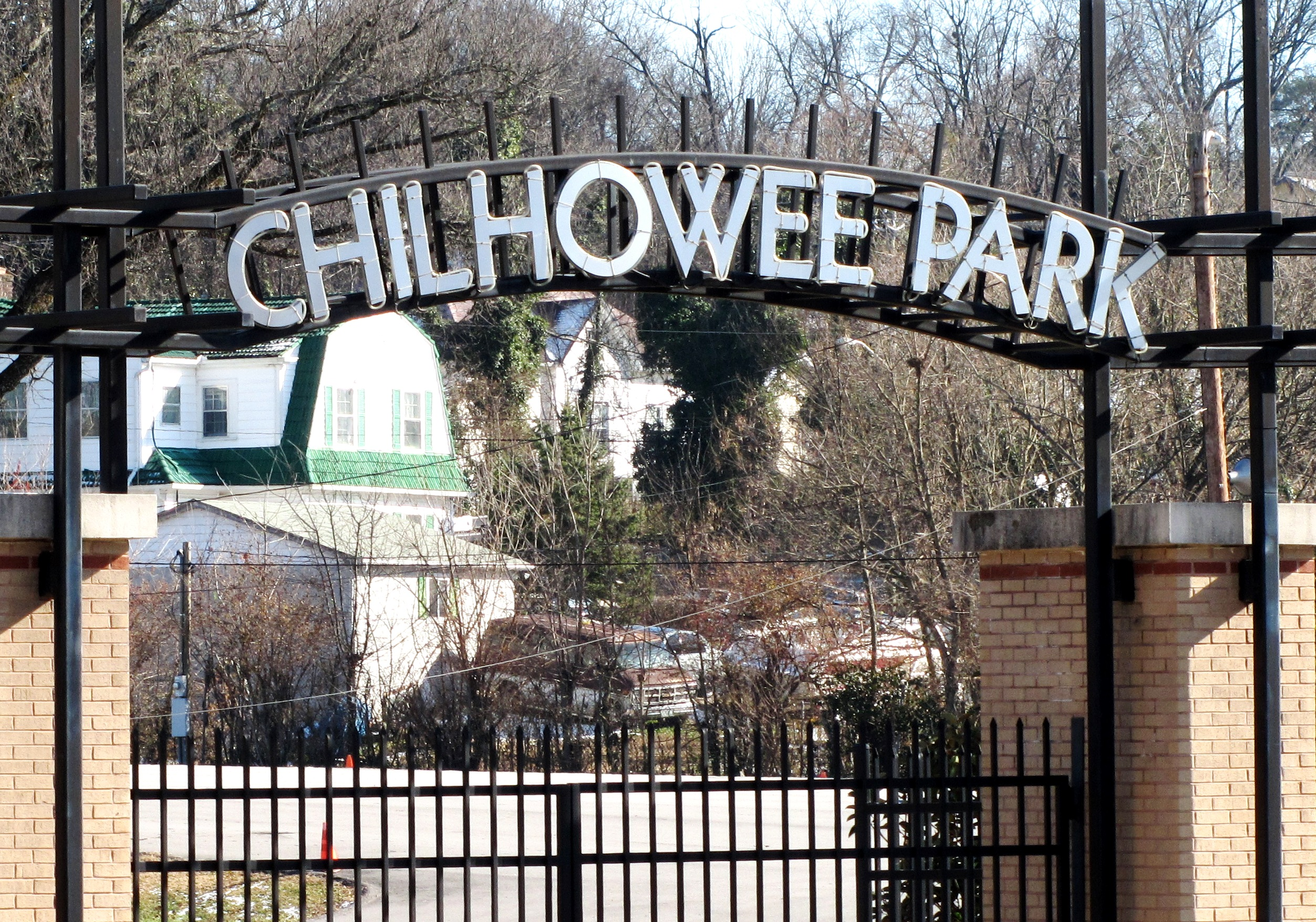
- Entrance along Magnolia Avenue
- Interactive map of Chilhowee Park
- Location: Knoxville, Tennessee
- Coordinates: 35.9983°N 83.8853°W
- Created: 1880s
- Website: www.chilhoweepark.com

Chilhowee Park is a public park, fairgrounds and exhibition venue in Knoxville, Tennessee, United States, located off Magnolia Avenue in East Knoxville. Developed in the late 19th century, the park is home to the Tennessee Valley Fair and hosts several dozen expositions annually.

The park covers 81 acres (33 ha), and includes a 57,100-square-foot (5,300 m^{2}) exposition center, a 1910-era bandstand, a 4,500-seat amphitheater, and a 3-acre (1.2 ha) lake, Lake Ottosee. The park is also home to the Muse Knoxville, a children's science museum formerly known as the East Tennessee Discovery Center.

== Background ==
The land that became Chilhowee Park was initially part of a dairy farm purchased by Professor Fernando Cortes Beaman (1836–1911) in 1875. In the late 1880s, Beaman converted part of the farm into a park with the construction of dance pavilions and mineral springs. In 1890, William Gibbs McAdoo extended trolley tracks along Magnolia Avenue all the way to the park, connecting it with Downtown Knoxville. Later that year, the Lake Park Springs Addition Company, which had been formed by Beaman and several partners to develop the adjacent Chilhowee Park neighborhood, purchased the park.

In 1910 and 1911, Chilhowee Park hosted the two Appalachian Expositions, which were held to demonstrate progress in Southern industry. Former president Theodore Roosevelt spoke at the 1910 exposition, and President William Howard Taft spoke in 1911. The expositions featured a large exhibit hall designed by architect John R. Graf, a Tennessee marble bandstand designed by architect R. F. Graf, and a building constructed by Knoxville College students to exhibit the city's African American history. The expositions saw the first airplane and zeppelin flights in East Tennessee, and helped boost the careers of local artists Lloyd Branson and Catherine Wiley. In 1913, the park hosted the National Conservation Exposition, which promoted environmental conservation in Southern Appalachia.

Furniture store magnate James G. Sterchi purchased Chilhowee Park in 1920, and leased it to the East Tennessee Division Fair (the forerunner of the Tennessee Valley Fair). In 1926, the City of Knoxville purchased the park, and continued the lease. In the 1930s, Joe "Smoky" Ellison opened one of Knoxville's first bowling alleys at the park. Jazz musician Louis Armstrong performed at Chilhowee Park in February 1957. During his performance, an unapprehended person tossed a stick of dynamite from the window of a car in an unsuccessful attempt to disrupt the event.

On August 8, 1863, the Military Governor of Tennessee, Andrew Johnson, freed his personal slaves. In the early part of the 20th century, August 8 of each year was the only day Black people in Knoxville were allowed to visit the park. During the early 20th century, the day was celebrated by Black people in Tennessee as a holiday.

== Bibliography ==
- Brewer, Becky French; McDaniel, Douglas Stuart (2005). Park City. Arcadia Publishing. ISBN 9780738541785.
