= Lloyd Branson =

American painter

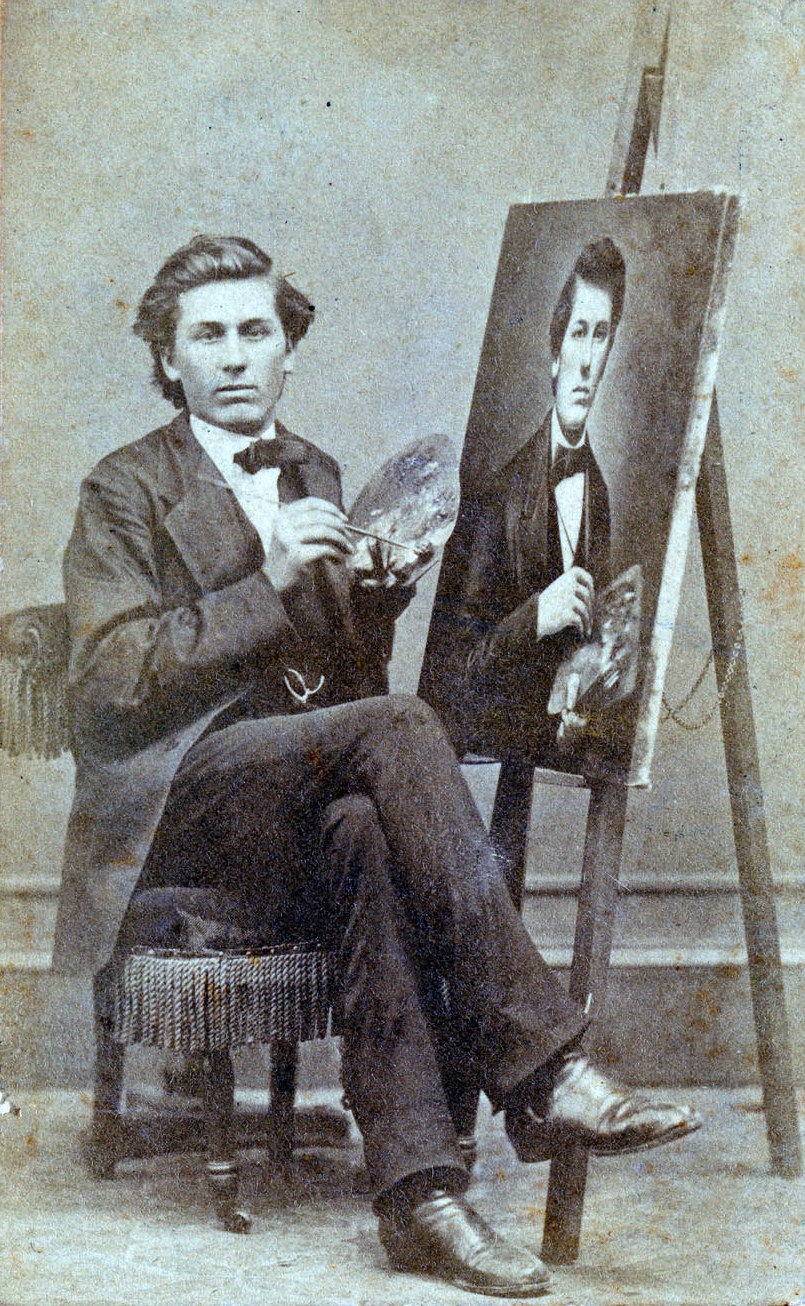
- Portrait of Branson (1873) by early Knoxville photographer T.M. Schleier
- Born: Enoch Lloyd Branson; 1853; Knox County, Tennessee
- Died: June 12, 1925 (aged 71–72); Knoxville, Tennessee
- Resting place: Old Gray Cemetery; Knoxville, Tennessee
- Education: University of Tennessee; National Academy of Design
- Known for: Painting

Enoch Lloyd Branson (1853–1925) was an American artist best known for his portraits of Southern politicians and depictions of early East Tennessee history. One of the most influential figures in Knoxville's early art circles, Branson received training at the National Academy of Design in New York the 1870s. After returning to Knoxville, he operated a portrait shop with photographer Frank McCrary. He was a mentor to fellow Knoxville artist Catherine Wiley, and is credited with discovering twentieth-century modernist Beauford Delaney.

== Life ==
Branson was born in what is now Union County, Tennessee, (then part of Knox County) to English parents. His family moved to Knoxville in 1868, where Lloyd found work in a brickyard. As a child, he impressed his friends by crafting small figures out of clay.

Around the time of the Civil War, prominent Knoxville physician John Mason Boyd noticed a sketch of Ulysses S. Grant Branson had made on a cigar box, and provided financial assistance for Branson to attend East Tennessee University. In 1871, Branson drew favorable attention for his exhibition at the East Tennessee Division Fair. By the following year, his portraits had impressed art enthusiasts to the extent that the Knoxville Chronicle described him as Knoxville's "native genius."

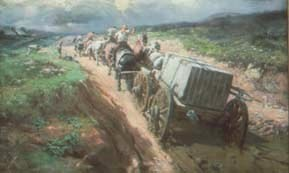
Hauling Marble

Branson moved to New York in 1873, where he attended the National Academy of Design. Two years later, he captured first prize at one of the Academy's exhibitions for his drawing of a gladiator, which earned him a scholarship to receive further training in Paris. Some of Branson's later work showed elements of the French Barbizon school, though it's uncertain whether or not he ever visited Europe.

By 1876, he had returned to Knoxville, and quickly became a leading figure in the city's art community. Working in partnership with early photographer T. M. Schleier, he focused primarily on commercial portraits. He became a regular at the masquerade balls attended by the city's elite at the Lamar House Hotel, and spent time at resorts such as Tate Springs.

In 1880, Branson and photographer Frank McCrary formed McCrary and Branson, a Photograph & Portrait Artists company that operated out of a three-story building on Gay Street in Knoxville. The company, which at times included Branson's brother, Oliver, and sister-in-law, Laura, specialized in oil-painted photographs, oil copies, crayon-and-oil sketches, and illustrated souvenirs. Branson also taught art classes in the building, often to members of Knoxville's upper class. Impressionist Catherine Wiley, Adelia Armstrong Lutz, and Mortimer Thompson were arguably his most well-known students during this period. Branson's work was exhibited at the 1893 Chicago World's Fair, the 1900 World's Fair in Paris, and the 1901 Pan-American Exposition in Buffalo. He won the gold medal for an exhibition at the 1895 Cotton States Exposition in Atlanta and in 1896, he won a national competition for designing the Flag of Knoxville, Tennessee.

Branson reached the height of his career in 1910, when his work, Hauling Marble, won the gold medal at Knoxville's Appalachian Exposition. In the early 1920s, Branson began giving lessons to a young Beauford Delaney, whose sketches he found impressive. In 1924, he arranged to send Delaney to an art school in Boston to receive further instruction.

Branson died of "chronic Bright's disease" on June 12, 1925. He is buried in Old Gray Cemetery in Knoxville.

== Works ==
Branson was a stylistically conservative painter, especially in his early years, though some of his later works show elements of impressionism and modern styles. Most of his work consisted of commercial portraits, but his most well-known tend to depict historical scenes of the Appalachian frontier. His work is on display in the Tennessee State Museum and the Frist Center for the Visual Arts in Nashville, and the Knoxville Museum of Art, the McClung Museum of Natural History and Culture, and the East Tennessee History Center in Knoxville. One of Branson's most popular paintings, The Battle of King's Mountain, was displayed in the Hotel Imperial in Knoxville, and was destroyed when the hotel burned in 1917.

=== Historical paintings ===
- Sheep Shearing Scene
- The Blockhouse at Knoxville, Tennessee
- Assault on Fort Sanders
- Hauling Marble (also known as The Toilers or Rock Haulers), (c. 1890)
- Women at Work, 1891
- California to Oregon Stagecoach, 1900
- Gathering of Overmountain Men at Sycamore Shoals, 1915

=== Portraits ===
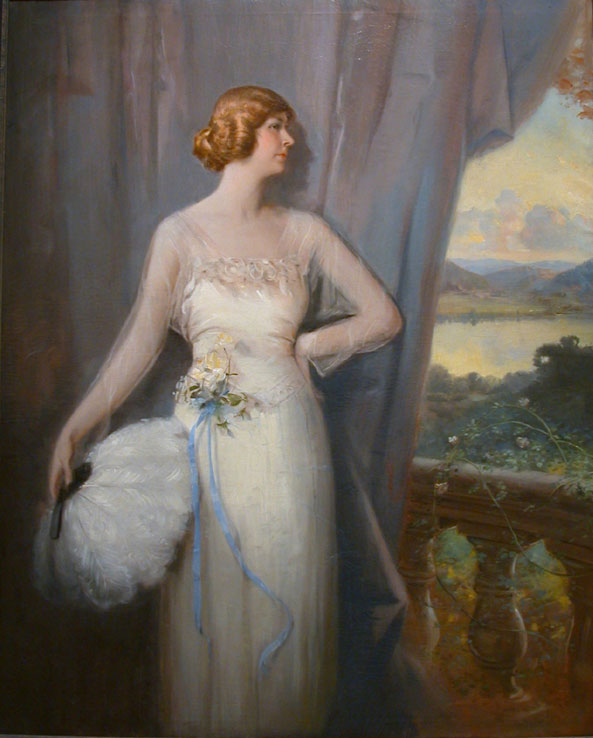
Branson's portrait of Ellen McClung Berry

Branson painted portraits of the following individuals:

- Ellen McClung Berry
- John I. Cox
- George Armstrong Custer, Lt. Col., Regular Army (United States)
- Joseph Estabrook
- James B. Frazier
- John Haywood
- Thomas William Humes
- Emma Elizabeth Strawn Johnson, Co-Founder and Second President of Johnson University (1925–27)
- Adelia Armstrong Lutz (1878)
- Horace Maynard
- Brig. Gen. John Porter McCown, C.S.A., c. 1880 (attributed)
- Robert J. McKinney (1885)
- Abram Jones Price
- J. G. M. Ramsey
- DeWitt Clinton Senter
- James Allen Smith
- Hester Thompson Stuart
- Montgomery Stuart
- Peter Turney
- Captain James N. Williamson, CSA (1916)
- Alvin C. York

== Legacy ==
Branson Avenue in Knoxville is named in Branson's honor. His house still stands along the road, and has been purchased for restoration by the preservation group, Knox Heritage.

== See also ==
- Washington Bogart Cooper
