= National Conservation Exposition =

Exposition held in Knoxville, Tennessee in 1913

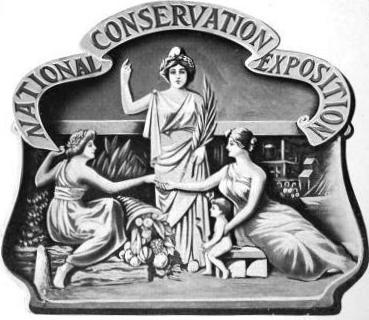
Seal of the National Conservation Exposition

The National Conservation Exposition was an exposition held in Knoxville, Tennessee, United States, between September 1, 1913, and November 1, 1913. The exposition celebrated the cause of bringing national attention to conservation activities, especially in the Southeastern United States. The fair was held in what is now Knoxville's Chilhowee Park in East Knoxville.

== History ==
Inspired by the successes of Knoxville's Appalachian Expositions of 1910 and 1911, civic leaders sought to bring greater national exposure to the community with a third exhibition in 1913. At its 1912 convention, the National Conservation Congress endorsed Knoxville as the conservation fair site, and the National Conservation Exposition Company was established. The Tennessee state legislature appropriated $25,000 for the Exposition with the passage of the Senate Bill #1, Chapter 19, of the general appropriation bill during the 58th General Assembly, but the state comptroller opposed the funding on the grounds that it was unconstitutional, and state courts agreed. Various East Tennessee counties and private donors then stepped in to provide the necessary funding. Additional federal funding was secured for the fair by May 1913. Knoxville attorney T. Asbury Wright (1866–1923) served as President of the Exposition.

The Exposition opened on Labor Day; September 1, 1913. President Woodrow Wilson addressed visitors via wireless transmission, and Governor Ben W. Hooper and Mayor Samuel G. Heiskell delivered speeches.

Although a national exhibition, it primarily focused on the natural resources of the South. The two-month exhibition drew over one million visitors. Nine major and six smaller buildings were constructed on-site to house its exhibits and demonstrations, including the Southern States Building, designed by local architect Charles I. Barber, and the Negro Building, designed and built by Knoxville College faculty and students. Among the visitors were Booker T. Washington, Helen Keller, William Jennings Bryan, Gifford Pinchot, and the Catholic Archbishop of Baltimore, Cardinal Gibbons. The content of the fair was mostly entertainment such as a mock coal mine explosion, moving pictures and John Robinson's "Herd of Trained Elephants". The conservation exhibits talked of progressive topics such as peak coal, the loss of topsoil due to poor farming techniques, and the value of wildlife. Several Knoxville citizens involved in the Exposition would later play a part in the creation of the nearby Great Smoky Mountains National Park.

Local painters Lloyd Branson, Adelia Armstrong Lutz, and Charles Krutch were among the artists who exhibited at the fair. Catherine Wiley, another local painter, served as Chairman of the Art Committee. Noted local photographer Jim Thompson provided much of the Exposition's promotional photography.

On September 11, 1913, a debate on women's suffrage took place at the Exposition, with Lizzie Crozier French delivering the pro-suffrage argument, and Annie Riley Hale delivering the anti-suffrage argument.

In April 2013, Knoxville Mayor Madeline Rogero announced that a Centennial Conservation Expo would be held in Chilhowee Park in October 2013.

== See also ==
- 1982 World's Fair
- List of world's fairs
- National Conservation Commission
