= Zoo Knoxville =

Zoo in Knoxville, Tennessee, United States

- Interactive map of Zoo Knoxville
- 35.9999°N 83.8880°W
- Location: Knoxville, Tennessee, United States
- Land area: 53 acres (21 ha)
- No. of animals: 800+
- Annual visitors: 585,000+
- Memberships: AZA
- Public transit: KAT
- Website: www.zooknoxville.org

Zoo Knoxville, formerly known as the Knoxville Zoo or Knoxville Zoological Gardens, is a 53-acre (21 ha) zoo located just east of downtown Knoxville, Tennessee, United States, near exit 392 off Interstate 40. The zoo is home to between 800 and 1,500 animals from 200 different species.

Zoo Knoxville is notable for having bred the first two African elephants born in the Western Hemisphere in 1978. The zoo also has bred more endangered red pandas than any other zoo in the world and is a leader in the breeding of endangered tortoises. The zoo is accredited by the Association of Zoos and Aquariums (AZA).

== History ==
In 1923, a Birthday Fund initiative was started by a local newspaper to start a park for underprivileged children. After slow progress, the Birthday Park was established in 1935 with help from the city of Knoxville and the New Deal. The park included a stone shelter, a small playground, and a wading pool on a hillside in Chilhowee Park. Discussion started about introducing a zoo, but funding again became an issue. The Birthday Park fell into disuse and neglect before being closed in 1946.

In 1948, the Knoxville News Sentinel aimed to revitalize the property as the Birthday Park Zoo using some leftover money from the 1923 initiative, plus more help from the city of Knoxville. In 1951, the zoo was opened and renamed the Municipal Zoo, with the first attraction being an American alligator named "Al". Around 4,000 people visited on the opening day.

In 1963, the Ringling Bros. and Barnum & Bailey Circus donated a particularly troublesome seven-ton bull African elephant named "Louie", or "Old Diamond". While this initially raised public interest, conditions and funds soon deteriorated, and Old Diamond contributed more problems by tearing up his early enclosures. In 1966, the Metropolitan Planning Commission announced plans to revitalize and modernize the zoo, but a lack of funds once again grounded the project through 1970. Following an effort by the Knoxville Journal to "Save Old Diamond", Dr. Bill Patterson helped found the Appalachian Zoological Society to oversee the formation of an educational zoo. Television executive Guy Lincoln Smith III bought a lion cub and took care of it until money could be raised for a proper facility to be built. With these two efforts, the modern Knoxville Zoo was founded in 1971. Smith served as the first director of the zoo until his death in 1987.

In the following years, Old Diamond was successfully mated to two younger female elephants, with two daughters being born in 1978. These were the first two African elephants born in the Western Hemisphere. This set a precedent for Knoxville Zoo to continue to work within the field of conservation until modern times, notably working with red pandas and spider tortoises.

A notable member of the zoo's outreach program was Einstein, an African grey parrot who appeared on many television shows and became famous for her ability to recreate over 300 sounds and words.

In 2016, Knoxville Zoo announced a massive rebranding campaign preceding a series of new and revitalized exhibits. With this, zoo executives announced that the property would be renamed Zoo Knoxville, reflecting a change that a few other zoos across the country had made.

== Exhibits ==
Zoo Knoxville is broadly divided into two halves, East Zoo and West Zoo. Each section features large and naturalistic outdoor habitats for their animal residents, as well as a few smaller indoor exhibits.

=== Black Bear Falls ===
The first habitat visitors encounter upon entering is Black Bear Falls, which houses several American black bears, an important species native to the nearby Great Smoky Mountains National Park. Several viewing areas are featured, as well as a small cave for children to explore educational facts about bears' hibernation behavior and diet.

=== Boyd Family Asian Trek and Red Panda Village ===
Continuing to East Zoo, the Boyd Family Red Panda Village is world-renowned for its red panda conservation program. In 2017, this section of the zoo was greatly expanded and revitalized as the Boyd Family Asian Trek, containing new habitats for Malayan tigers, white-handed gibbons, silvered leaf langurs, and white-naped cranes.

=== Clayton Family Kids Cove ===
At the east end of the zoo, Clayton Family Kids Cove contains a variety of activities geared towards children. These include a carousel, playground, and sandbox. Kids Cove features a petting zoo with a number of domestic animals like sheep and goats, as well as small exhibits featuring North American beavers and budgies.

The far eastern area of the zoo behind Kids Cove formerly held the original reptile house, along with a few smaller exhibits with otters and birds. This section, along with other regions along the perimeter of the zoo, are undergoing extensive revitalization as part of the zoo's larger rebranding campaign announced in 2016. As of March 2022, this section of the zoo displays retired birds of prey from the zoo's former bird show.

=== Clayton Family Amphibian and Reptile Conservation Campus ===
Following the closure of the outdated reptile houses at the eastern end of the zoo, the Clayton Family Amphibian and Reptile Conservation Campus (ARC) opened just past Black Bear Falls in the spring of 2021, replacing a smaller "Birds of Central America" exhibit at the center of the zoo. This exhibit contains dozens of indoor naturalistic habitats for various reptile and amphibian species, and it is considered to be a massive upgrade from the previous version. Notable species include the Cuban crocodile and various tortoise varieties that are a focal point of the zoo's conservation efforts. The exhibit also features a two-toed sloth.

As part of the second phase of this building complex, the Clayton Otter Creek exhibit opened in March 2022, featuring a revitalized habitat for the zoo's North American river otters.

=== Pilot Flying J Wee Play Adventure ===
A series of smaller buildings populate the pathway between the ARC and Grasslands Africa. One such building is the Pilot Flying J Wee Play Adventure, featuring an indoor playground and assorted activities for children along with smaller herpetology exhibits, the most notable being a Komodo dragon. Just outside of Wee Play is the zoo's Aldabra giant tortoise. An aviary (housing the zoo's flock of macaws) and an immersive boardwalk experience called the Ravine opened in 2025.

=== Grasslands Africa ===
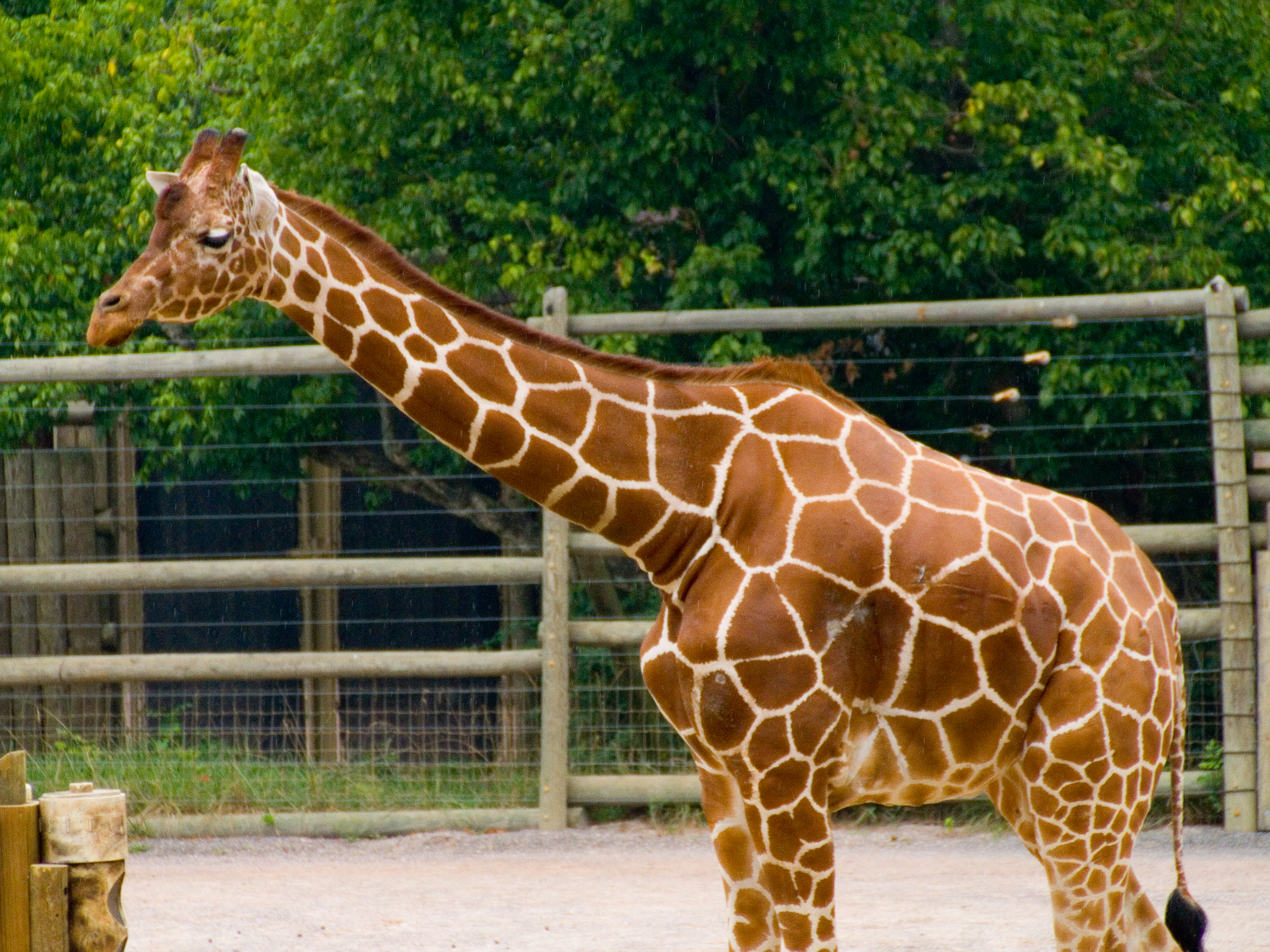
Giraffe at the zoo.

In West Zoo, the largest series of habitats are intended to evoke an African savanna. The Williams Family Giraffe Encounter provides guests with the opportunity to feed reticulated giraffes. Other featured species include common ostriches, southern ground hornbills, bat-eared foxes, and African wild dogs, as well as the neighboring Valley of the Kings exhibit, which features exhibits for lions and Hamadryas baboons. The area also features a restaurant and a splash pad for children.

The Stokely African Elephant Preserve formerly housed three African elephants: a male named Tonka and two females named Jana and Edie. As these elephants reached old age, the zoo began an initiative in late 2022 to retire them to The Elephant Sanctuary in Tennessee to receive the proper standard of care for their advanced stage of life. After Edie and Jana were successfully transported to the Sanctuary, Tonka died in May 2024. The existing habitat and barn were converted to facilitate a breeding program for southern white rhinos. The zoo previously held several white rhinos, first where the Boyd Family Asian Trek currently sits, and most recently directly across from the Stokely African Elephant Preserve. Their last rhino, Dolly, was the oldest rhino in the United States when she died in February 2025 at age 56 (born 1968, arrived at the zoo in 1976). The new southern white rhinoceros reserve featuring two male southern white rhinos, Mylo and Ranger, opened to the public on May 23, 2025. The zoo's rhino herd added two additional males later that summer.

=== Gorilla Valley and Chimp Ridge ===
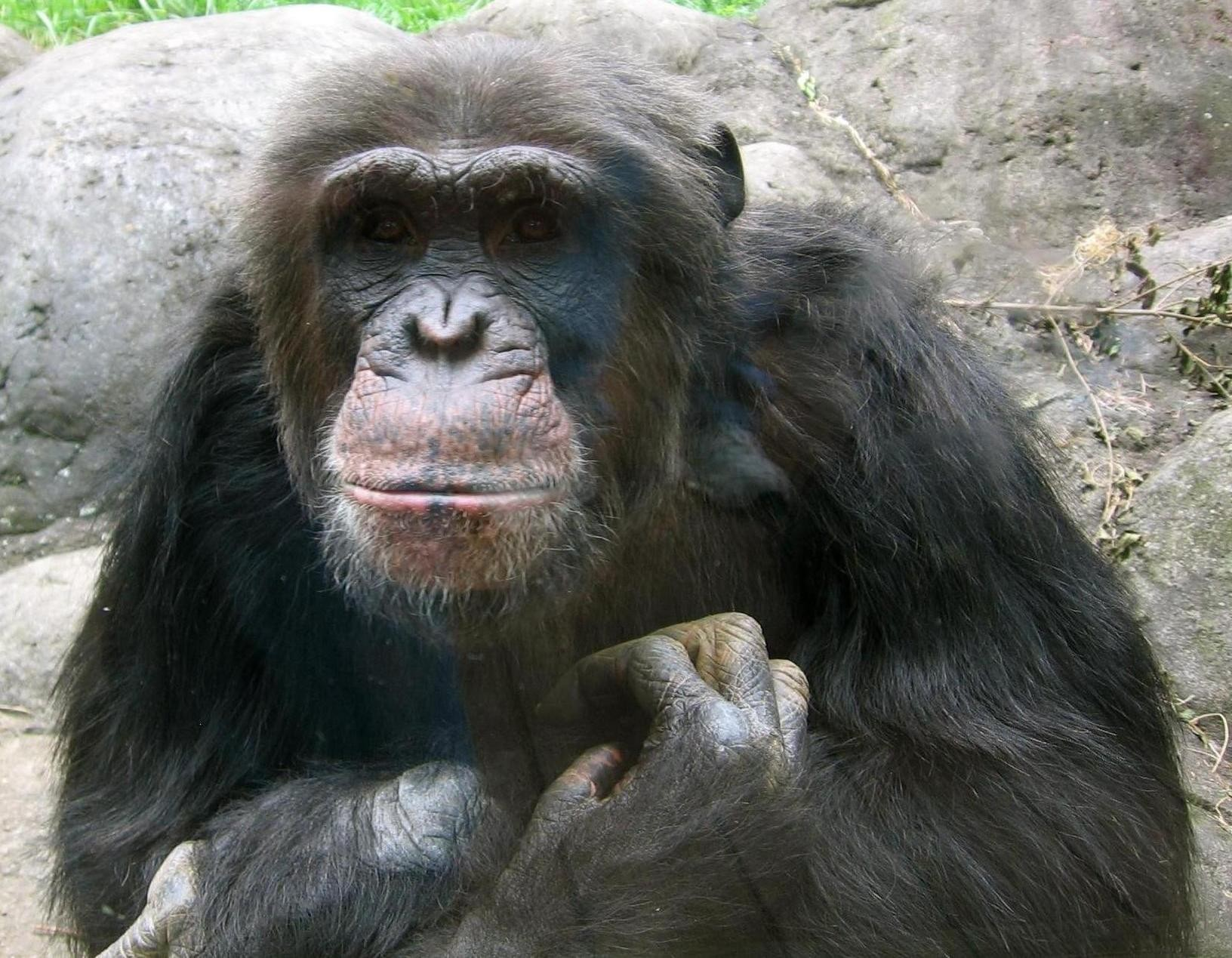
Chimpanzee at Chimp Ridge.

The remainder of West Zoo is largely themed around a bamboo forest housing families of western lowland gorillas and chimpanzees respectively.

== Conservation ==
The Knoxville Zoo has been successful at breeding several endangered species, especially red pandas and white rhinos. The zoo also bred the first African elephant in captivity in the Western Hemisphere, nicknamed "Lil' Diamond" in 1978.

In 2009, Sarah Glass, curator of red pandas and Special Exhibits at the Knoxville Zoo in Knoxville, Tennessee, was appointed as coordinator for the North American Red Panda Species Survival Plan. The Knoxville Zoo has the largest number of captive red panda births in the Western Hemisphere (101 as of August 2011). Only the Rotterdam Zoo in the Netherlands has had more captive births worldwide.

At the end of 2010, Mozilla Foundation—the creator of Firefox web browser—partnered with Knoxville Zoo in an effort to raise awareness about endangered red pandas. Two red panda cubs born at the Knoxville Zoo have officially become a part of the Mozilla community. The cubs were named Spark and Ember by online voters, and Mozilla broadcast a 24-hour live video stream of the cubs.

The recently opened Amphibian and Reptile Center (ARC) undertakes conservation of endangered species, notably various species of turtles and tortoises.

== Incidents ==
On January 14, 2011, zookeeper Stephanie James was killed when one of the zoo's two female elephants, Edie, pushed her into the side of the indoor stall. The incident was deemed to be an accident, not a malicious attack by the elephant. A small memorial garden was planted along the Grasslands Africa trek.
