= Bart on the Road =

- The Simpsons episode
- Episode no.: Season 7 Episode 20
- Directed by: Swinton O. Scott III
- Written by: Richard Appel
- Production code: 3F17
- Original air date: March 31, 1996

Guest appearance
- Jim Lau as Hong Kong Doctor

Episode features
- Couch gag: The Simpsons are set onto the couch like bowling pins.
- Commentary: Matt Groening; Bill Oakley; Josh Weinstein; Richard Appel; David Silverman

Episode chronology
| ← Previous "A Fish Called Selma" | Next → "22 Short Films About Springfield" |
- The Simpsons season 7

"Bart on the Road" is the twentieth episode of the seventh season of the American animated television series The Simpsons. It originally aired on the Fox network in the United States on March 31, 1996. In the episode, Bart makes his own fake driver's license he acquired from the Department of Motor Vehicles (DMV) and takes Milhouse, Martin, and Nelson on a road trip that goes awry, and Lisa has to help them get back home after they become stranded far away from Springfield.

The episode was written by Richard Appel, and directed by Swinton O. Scott III. The idea of a road trip was "so exciting" that the writers immediately knew they wanted to write it. The episode features cultural references to the 1991 film Naked Lunch, American singer Andy Williams, and Look magazine.

Since airing, the episode has received positive reviews from television critics; Central Michigan Life named it the eighth-best episode of the series. It acquired a Nielsen rating of 7.2 and was the fifth highest-rated show on the Fox network the week it aired.

== Plot ==
After encountering administrative errors that will require him to begin his vacation one day earlier than expected, Principal Skinner abruptly changes the final day of the school semester to be a "go to work with your parents day" so he can close the school early. Lisa goes to the nuclear power plant with Homer, while Bart, after finding out he is not allowed to just stay at home and watch Marge do housework (since Principal Skinner declared that being a homemaker is not a real job), instead goes with Patty and Selma to the Department of Motor Vehicles. Bart makes himself a fake driver's license while at the DMV, and later uses it to rent a car and arrange a road trip with Nelson, Milhouse and Martin, paid for with $600 that Martin's father helped him earn on the futures market.

The boys soon hit the road after each giving their parents an alibi concocted by Bart. At first, they travel aimlessly for a while and frivolously spend Martin's money at multiple stops, before deciding to travel to the World's Fair in Knoxville, Tennessee. Only after arriving at World's Fair Park do they discover that the Fair was held in 1982, and they spend the last of Martin's money on mediocre souvenirs. A frustrated Nelson throws a rock at the Sunsphere and causes it to topple, crushing the boys' car and leaving them stranded in Knoxville.

Bart places a collect call to Lisa, who has so far spent her entire spring break at the power plant with Homer, and asks her to help him return home while concealing the ordeal from their parents. On her advice, Bart becomes a courier, but none of his assignments take him anywhere close to Springfield. Lisa tells Homer of Bart's predicament after making him promise he will not get angry. Homer deliberately destroys his workstation so that he can order a replacement unit from the Oak Ridge National Laboratory and have it shipped via nearby Knoxville, with Bart as the courier and the other boys stowing away inside the shipment crate.

With Bart safely back in Springfield, Lisa and Homer quietly fume at him at the dinner table. However, Marge remains clueless about Bart's misadventures, despite later receiving multiple confusing phone calls from Principal Skinner (who saw Bart during a delivery run in Hong Kong), the Tennessee State Police, and the courier service that employed Bart.

== Production ==
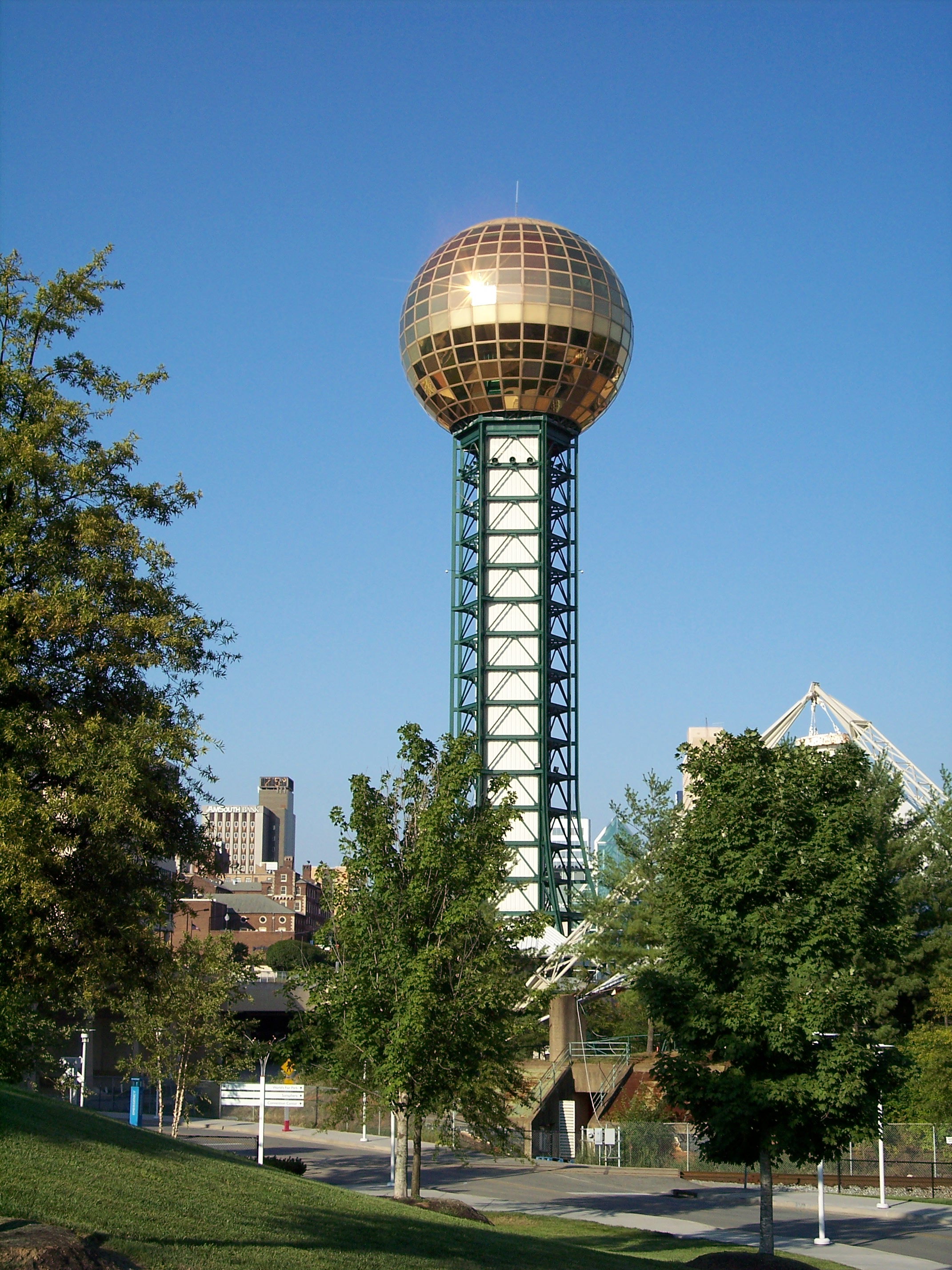
The writers decided that the characters would go to a "funny unlikely place", the Sunsphere in Knoxville, Tennessee.

The episode was written by Richard Appel, who wanted to do an episode that had two things; a "go to work with your parents day" and Bart getting a driver's license. The "go to work with your parents day" idea appealed to Appel because it was something he "lost the right" to do when he went from public school to private school as a child. Appel considered those days to be his favorites because he "didn't have to do anything" at his parents' job. The idea of having a driver's license was something that Appel dreamed about when he was younger.

The writing staff had never done a spring break episode before so they thought, "What would Lisa and Bart do on spring break?" and came up with the road trip plot. Bill Oakley, the show runner of The Simpsons at the time, said that road trips were something that the writers liked to write stories about. The idea of four children going on a road trip was "so exciting" that they immediately knew they wanted to write it. There was a debate over where the children would go, and Fort Lauderdale, Florida, was first suggested, but the writers eventually decided to have them go to a "funny unlikely place". Oakley's show runner partner, Josh Weinstein, said that the writers were always looking for combinations of characters that had not been done many times on the show. Homer and Lisa had not been done "too often" and they wanted the two characters to bond and get closer to each other.

The episode was directed by Swinton O. Scott III. It was difficult to animate because the animators had to draw completely new designs for the locations outside of Springfield, such as Knoxville. The car scenes were also difficult to animate. At the time, The Simpsons was using traditional animation without computers, but they had to get one for a scene where the camera spins around the car from above. The car was difficult to animate because it had to "look real" and not "boxy like a truck". The car was based on a 1993 Oldsmobile car with rounded edges. The Simpsons animator David Silverman said that the episode was "probably the most difficult one" Scott had to direct on the show.

== Cultural references ==
During his visit to the cracker factory as part of the "go to work with your parents day", Milhouse and his father slide down poles like Batman and Robin in the 1960s Batman TV series. Bart and his friends use Bart's fake license to see the R-rated 1991 film Naked Lunch, an adaptation of William Burroughs's novel dealing with heroin addiction, homosexuality, and hallucinogens. While leaving the theater after viewing the film, Nelson Muntz muses, "I can think of at least two things wrong with that title". Principal Skinner books a vacation with AmeriWestica, a parody of America West Airlines. The boys also see an Andy Williams concert in Branson, Missouri, and the marquee advertising it outside reads "Wow! He's still got it – Look magazine", with Look having been out of business for 25 years when the episode first aired. On the road, the boys pick up a hitchhiker, who is based on the hitchhiker in The Texas Chain Saw Massacre. "Radar Love" by Dutch rock band Golden Earring is also heard. Bart says of Branson: "My dad says it's like Las Vegas if it were run by Ned Flanders."

== Reception ==
In its original broadcast, "Bart on the Road" finished 63rd in the ratings for the week of March 25 to March 31, 1996, with a Nielsen rating of 7.2. The episode was the fifth-highest-rated show on the Fox network that week, following The X-Files, Cops, Party of Five, Martin, and Melrose Place.

The episode's portrayal of Knoxville and World's Fair Park was criticized by Knoxville municipal officials, with the Washington Post pointing out that while World's Fair Park remained largely disused, the Sunsphere and the main facilities at the park were in good condition and received regular maintenance. The Fox affiliate that broadcast the episode in Knoxville, WTNZ, reported that the reaction from local viewers was mostly positive, with most callers to the station wanting to know when the episode would air again.

Since airing, the episode has received positive reviews from television critics. The authors of the book I Can't Believe It's a Bigger and Better Updated Unofficial Simpsons Guide, Gary Russell and Gareth Roberts, said that it "contains some superb touching character scenes between Homer and Lisa, a fascinating glimpse of Marge's insecurities, and some nice touches that take it above the show's very high average."

Dave Foster of DVD Times said that "Bart on the Road" is an episode which is built upon a "frankly ludicrous" idea which if the writers were to "stumble upon" now, "we'd simply see Bart happen upon a license and skip town without anyone noticing, but here they do give the setup a great deal of consideration both on and off the screen." He thought the story was "partly believable, though the opportunity when Bart hits the road is largely wasted with only a few well-constructed jokes to speak of." Foster thinks, "what saves the episode is the opportunity to see Lisa and Homer connect, once again displaying what a strong season this is for Lisa as we see the two share some wonderfully tender moments, alongside some genuinely laugh-out-loud moments."

DVD Movie Guide's Colin Jacobson enjoyed the episode and said that he "loves" the children's experiences at their parents' jobs, adding, "and when they head out of town, the fun continues. Any episode that sends the kids to the site of the World's Fair is OK by me."

Jennifer Malkowski of DVD Verdict considered the best part of the episode to be when Patty and Selma explain their job at the DMV: "Somedays we don't let the line move at all. We call those weekdays." Malkowski concluded her review by giving the episode a grade of B+. John Thorpe of Central Michigan Life named it the eighth-best episode of the series. Robert Canning of IGN gave the episode a score of 9.5 out of 10, calling it "outstanding" and summarizing his review with: "'Bart on the Road' is a fun trip and very funny, but it's the way everything comes together that really makes it memorable."
