= World's Fair Park =

Park in Knoxville, Tennessee, United States

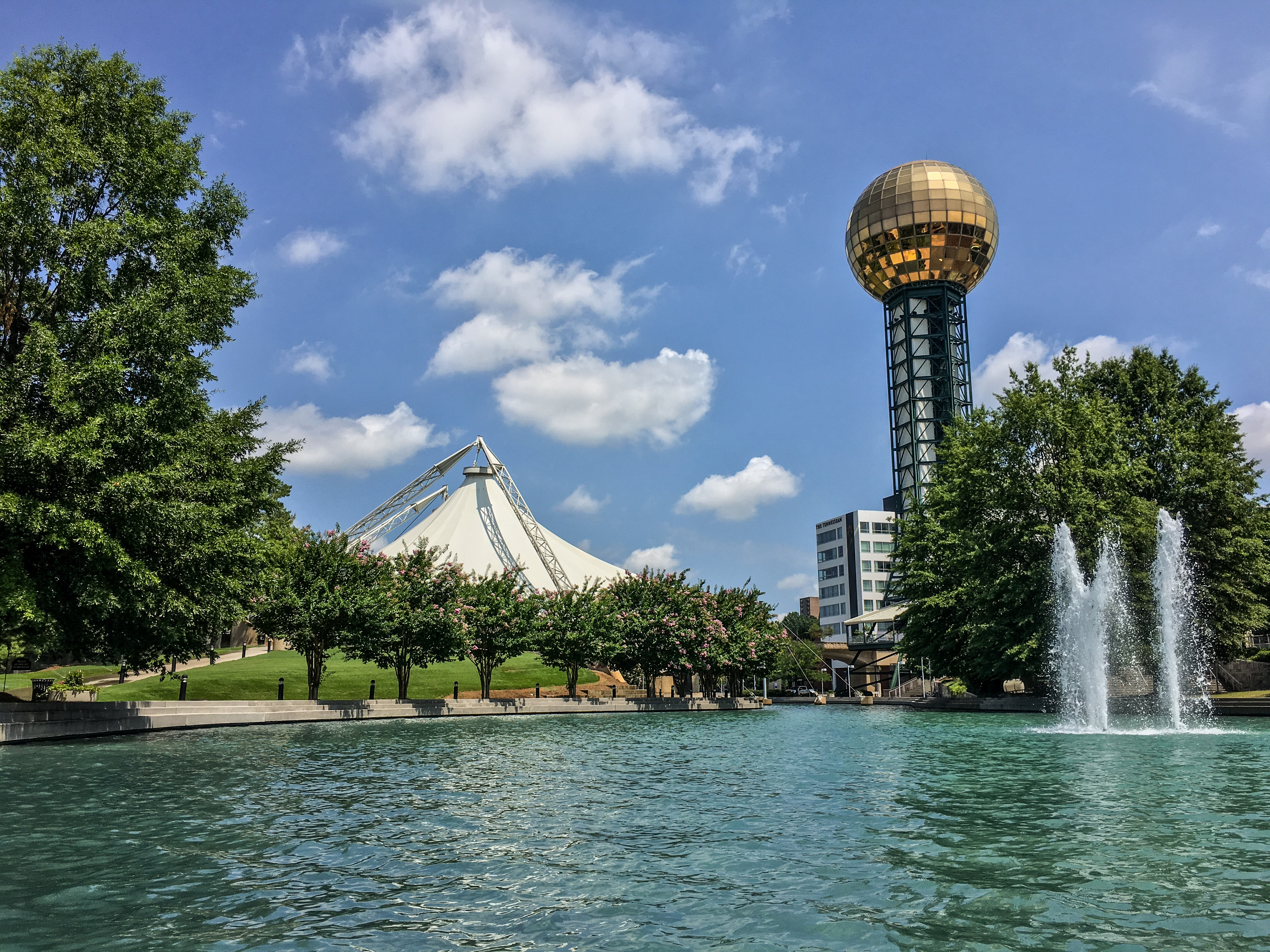
- World's Fair Park, with the Sunsphere and Tennessee Amphitheater in the background
- Interactive map of World's Fair Park
- Type: Public park
- Location: Knoxville, Tennessee, United States
- Coordinates: 35°57′41″N 83°55′26″W
- Created: May 1, 1982
- Owner: City of Knoxville
- Operator: Knoxville Public Building Authority
- Open: 6:00 a.m. to 12:00 a.m.
- Public transit: KAT 10, 11, 17, 42, 81, 82
- Website: http://worldsfairpark.org/

World's Fair Park is a public park in downtown Knoxville, Tennessee. The park sits on the former fairgrounds of the 1982 World's Fair hosted in Knoxville. Today, the park is home to the Sunsphere and the Tennessee Amphitheater, the two remaining structures from the exposition.

== Overview ==
The park features a festival and performance lawn, a small lake with a fountain, and the Sunsphere. The 5-acre (2.0 ha) performance lawn is used for cultural and community events. Knoxville's Public Building Authority manages the park, except for the Sunsphere. The Knoxville Museum of Art, the Knoxville Convention Center, and the L&N STEM Academy, at the former Louisville and Nashville station, surround the park. To the west of the park borders a building known as the Candy Factory, which formerly housed the South, Littlefield & Steere Company and its factory. During the fair, the Candy Factory building was used by administration. Recently, the building was renovated into office, gallery, and rehearsal space, and later into condominiums.

The Knoxville District K&A Line, operated by the Norfolk Southern Railway, starts at northernmost part of the park and ends in Maryville in nearby Blount County. As of 2019, the tracks are being considered by urban developers and city councilmembers for a conversion into a light rail line.

== History ==
Before the fair, the site was used as a railroad yard. The land was converted into park space for the 1982 World's Fair. After the fair closed in October 1982, the site was cleaned up; the city had to demolish pavilions, remove graffiti, and remove homeless individuals from the remaining abandoned buildings. Throughout the rest of the 1980s and into the early 1990s, the Sunsphere and U.S. Pavilion were left without tenants. In 1991, the U.S. Pavilion was demolished by implosion due to structural damage caused by neglect. In 2007, the Sunsphere began to see occupancy. Today, it currently houses offices and a public observation deck.

In 2018, the Knoxville City Council approved a $2.5-million renovation of the Sunsphere and Amphitheater, updating the Sunsphere's elevators, replacing HVAC units, repairing windows, and repainting the exterior of both structures. In 2019, the park's performance lawn closed for a $3 million renovation, and reopened later in July of the same year. In 2019, the Knoxville Marathon's finish line was relocated to the park, due to renovations at Neyland Stadium, the location of the original finish line.

== Gallery ==
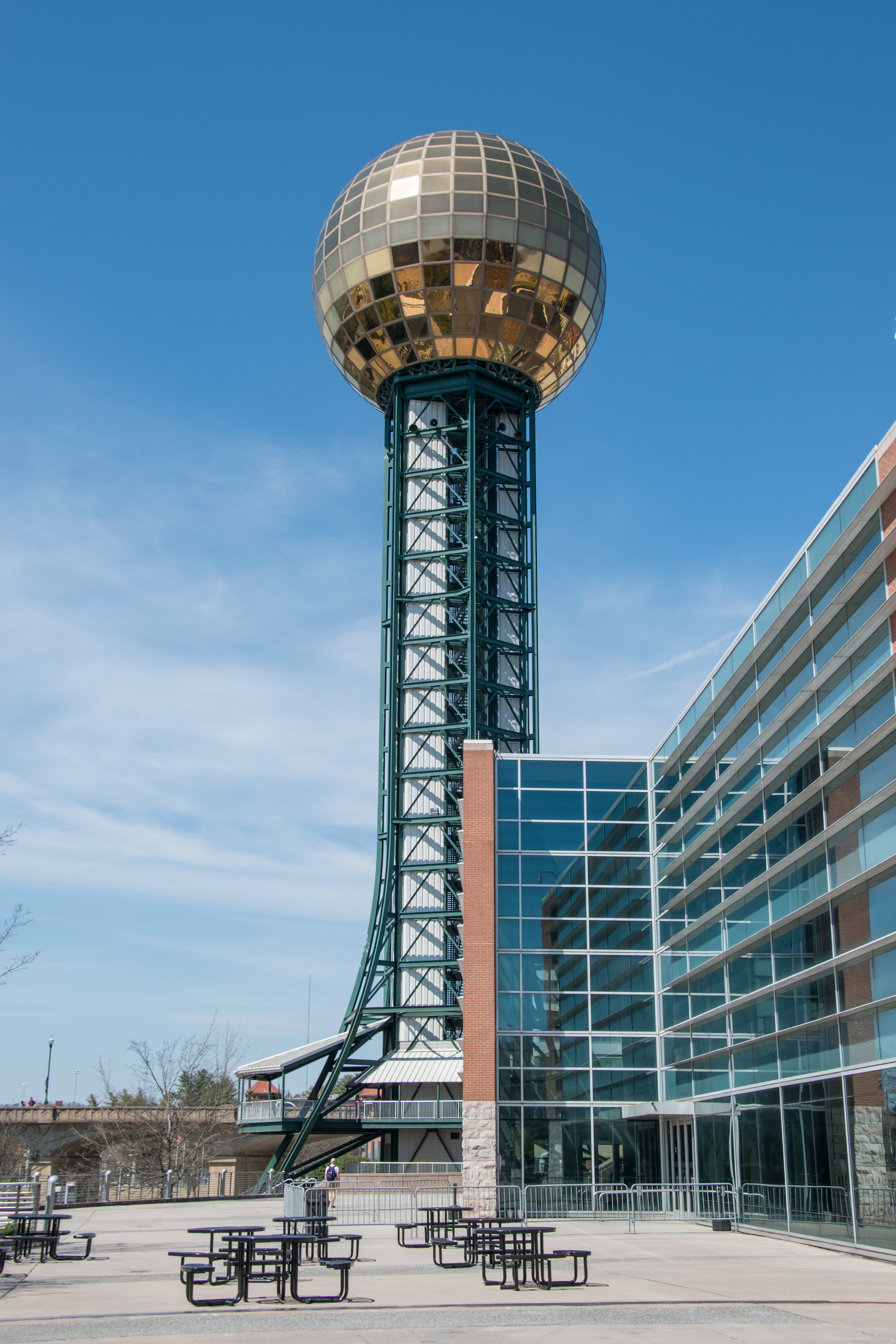
The Sunsphere, as seen from the southern part of the park.

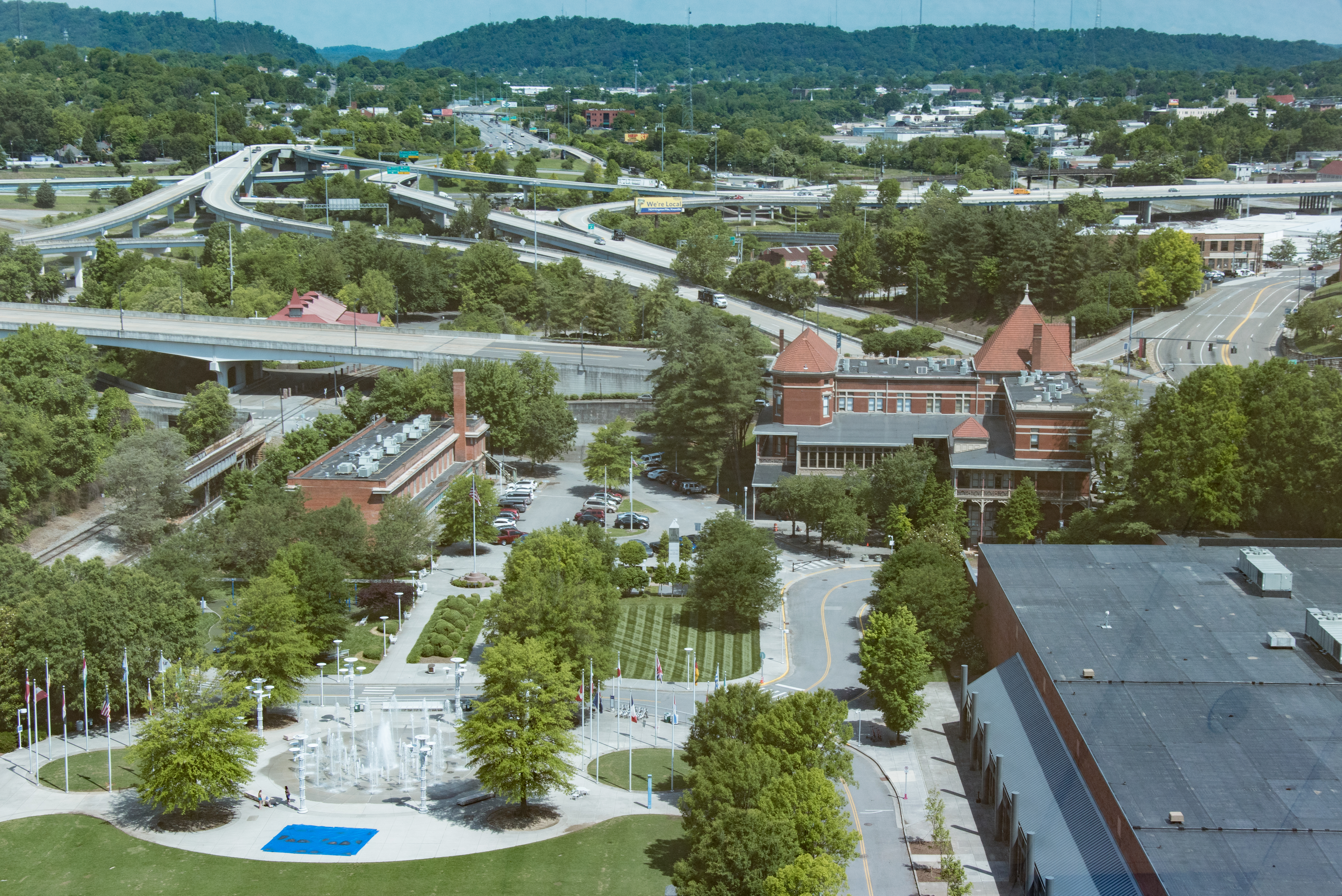
Northern portion of the park, with the East Tennessee Veterans Memorial in the center, World's Fair Exhibition Hall to the bottom right, and L&N STEM Academy to the upper right.

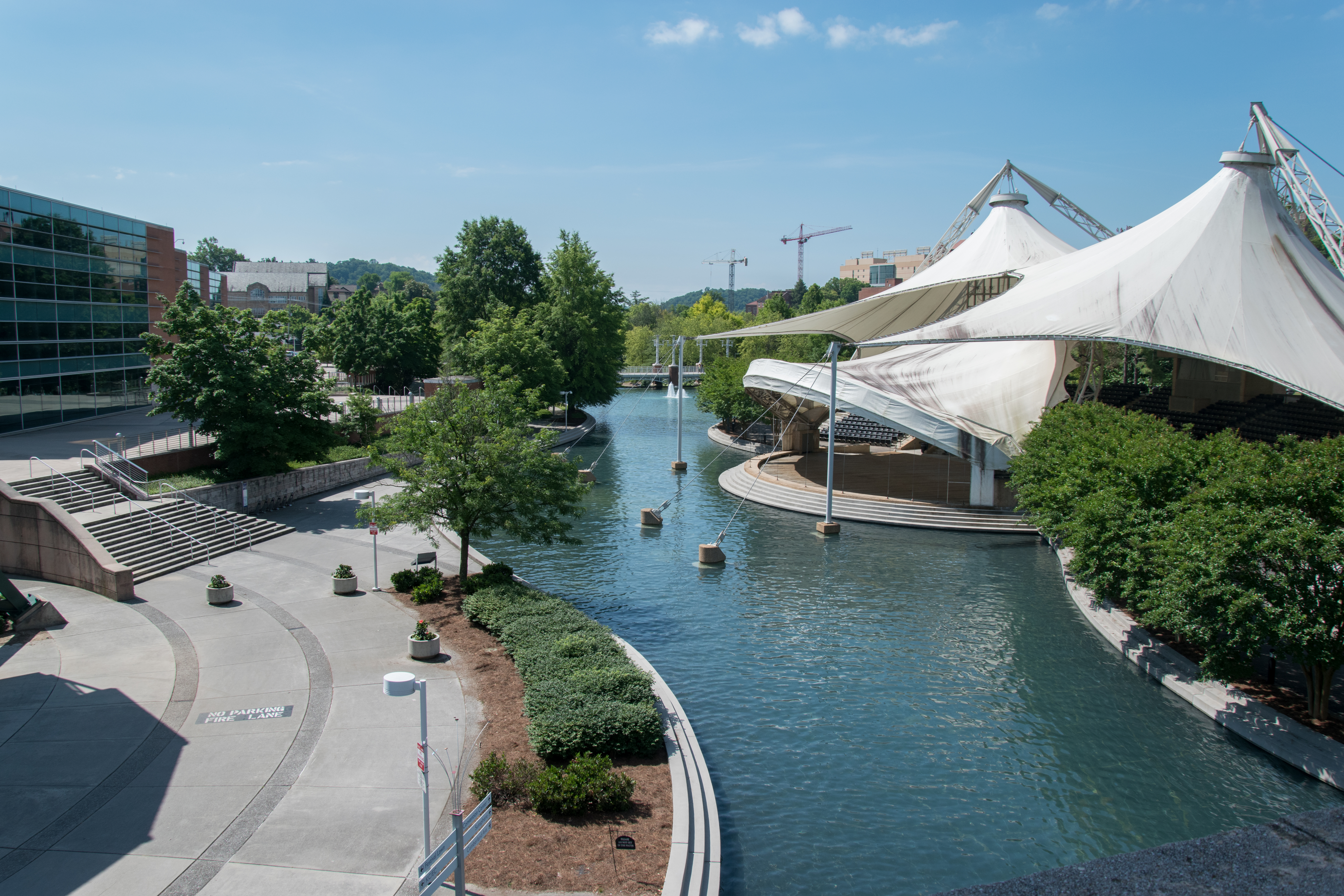
Southern portion of the park, with the Knoxville Convention Center at the left and the Tennessee Amphitheater at the right

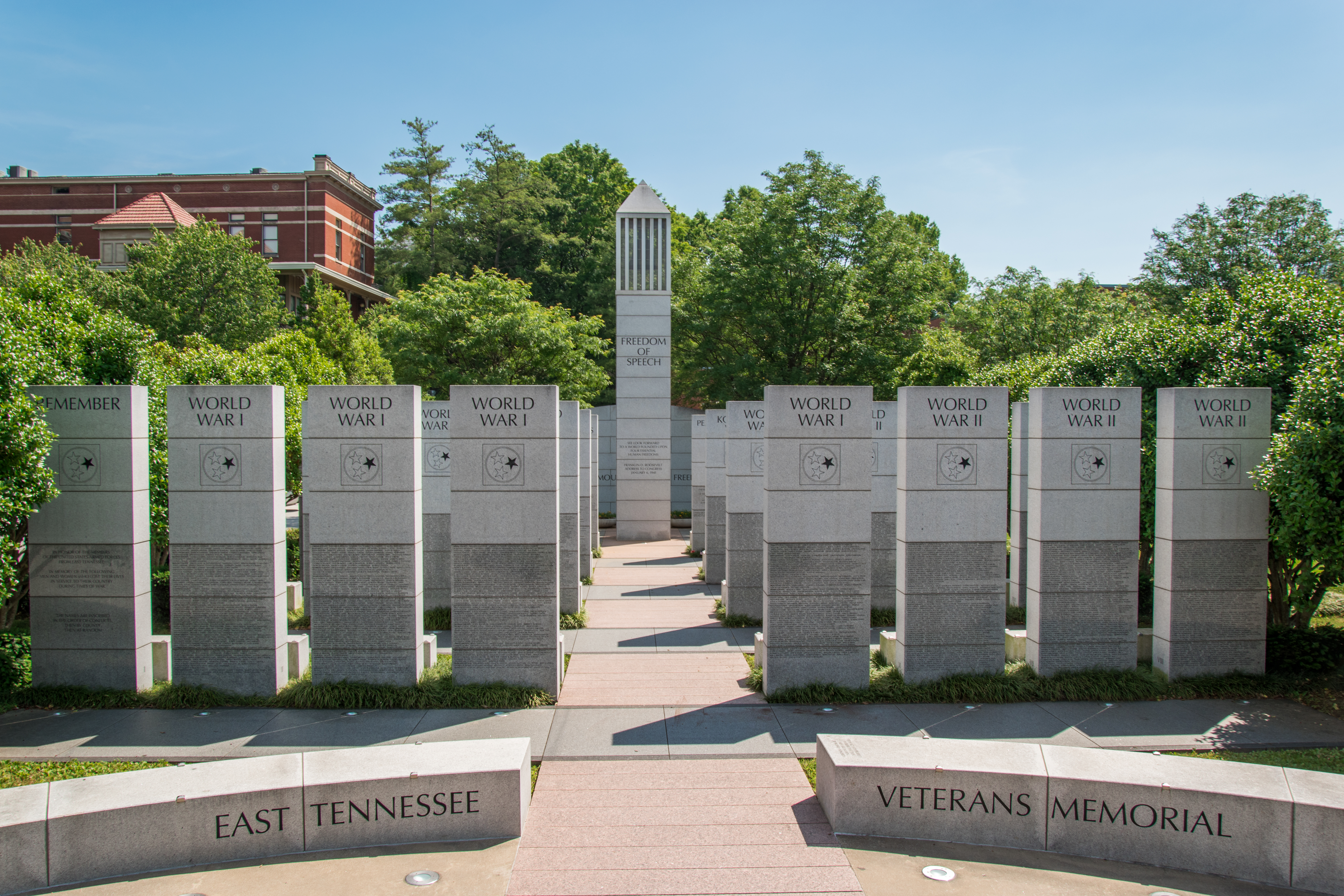
East Tennessee Veterans Memorial located in the northern portion of the park.
