= Knoxville Marathon =

Annual race in the United States held since 2005

- Date: March or April
- Location: Knoxville, Tennessee, U.S.
- Event type: Road
- Distance: Marathon
- Primary sponsor: Covenant Health
- Established: 2005 (21 years ago)
- Website: https://knoxvillemarathon.com
- Participants: 588 finishers (2019)

The Covenant Health Knoxville Marathon is an annual marathon foot-race run in Knoxville, Tennessee, USA, established in 2005. A prize fund of $10,000 is distributed between the top finishers in the marathon and half marathon.

== History ==
The 42.195-kilometre (26.219 mi) race was established in 2005 and has been run annually ever since.

The 2020 in-person edition of the race was cancelled due to the coronavirus pandemic, with all registrants given the option of running the race virtually, transferring their entry to 2021 or 2022, or obtaining a refund. (Note: It had initially been postponed to 2020.11.15 before being cancelled.)

The Knoxville marathon celebrated its 20th anniversary in 2024.

== Course ==
External image
- Course map of full marathon in 2019

The course starts in Downtown Knoxville at Clinch Ave. bridge near the Knoxville Convention Center in the shadows of the Sunsphere. The race boasted a unique finish, ending on the 50 yard line of the University of Tennessee's Neyland Stadium, from 2005 to 2018. In 2019, the finish line was changed to World's Fair Park due to stadium renovations and this remains the finish line today.

The course time limit is 7 hours.

== Winners ==
Date	Male	From	Time	Female	From	Time	Refs.
2017.04.02	Dylan Belles	USA	2:25:14	Gina Rouse	USA	2:52:05	
2018.03.28	Bryan Morseman	USA	2:27:11	Gina Rouse	USA	2:56:33	
2019.03.31	Birhanu Dare	ETH	2:24:42	Gina Rouse	USA	2:50:14	
2020	cancelled due to coronavirus pandemic						
2021.10.3	Ethan Coffey	USA	2:47:41	Eden Slater	USA	3:16:50	
2022.03.27	Ethan Coffey	USA	2:31:12	Caroline Kimble	USA	3:07:39	
2023.04.02	Stephen Martinez	USA	2:32:27	Stephanie Buchanan	USA	2:44:19	
2024.04.07	Adam Chase	USA	2:33:18	Peighton Meske	USA	2:44:41	
2025.04.06	Alec Sandusky	USA	2:21:31	Gina Rouse	USA	2:54:34	
