= Tennessee Amphitheater =

Amphitheater in Knoxville, Tennessee, US

Coordinates: 35.9612°N 83.9239°W

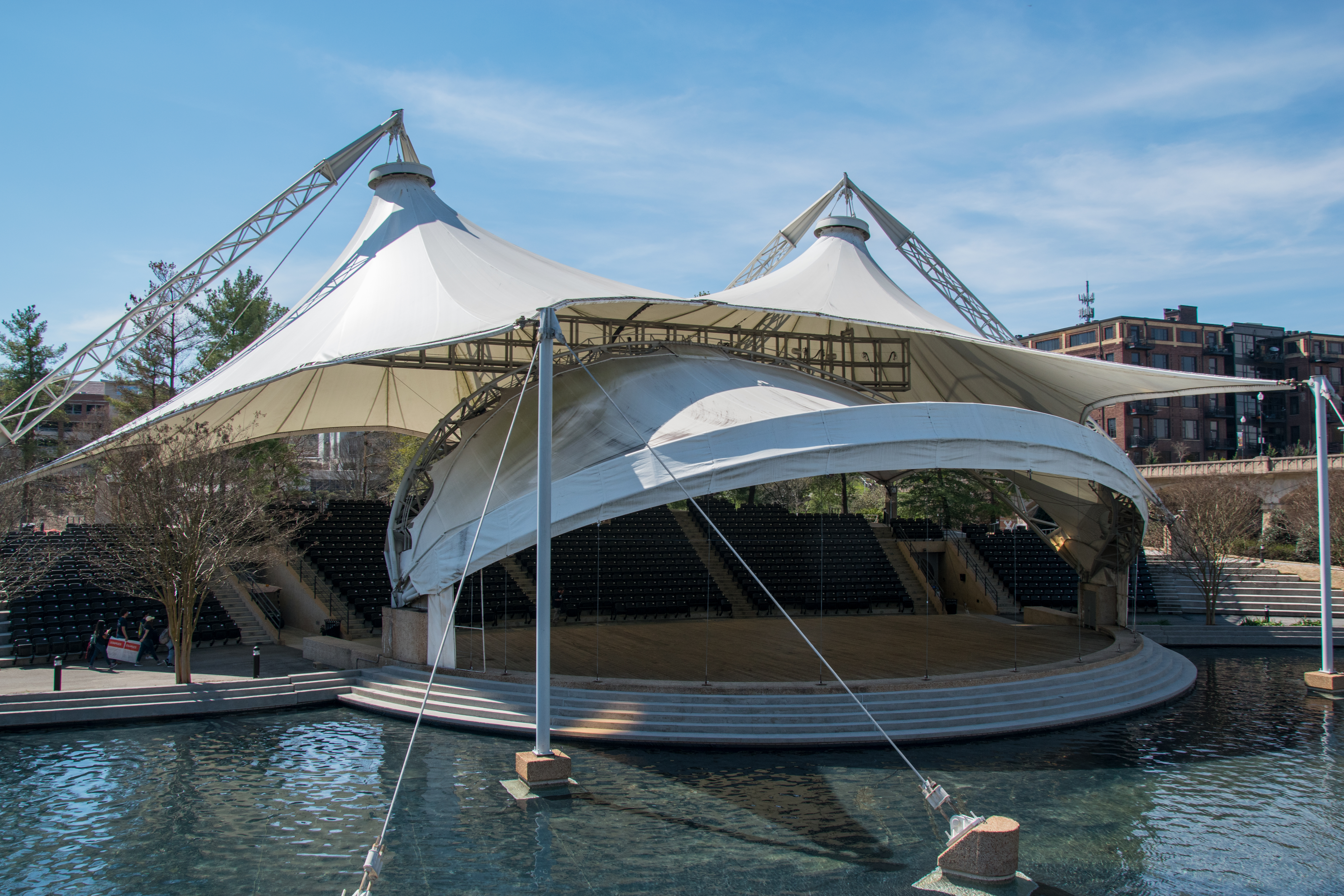
The Tennessee Amphitheater

The Tennessee Amphitheater, also known as the World's Fair Park Amphitheater, is an open-air amphitheater located in the 1982 World's Fair Park in Knoxville, Tennessee.

== History ==
The Tennessee Amphitheater was built for the 1982 World's Fair and was designed by structural engineer Horst Berger, part of McCarty Bullock and Holsaple, architects of Knoxville (led by architect Bruce McCarty, the Master Architect of the 1982 World's Fair), and Geiger Berger, structural engineers of New York City. Berger was known for his work with tensile architecture, and the architectural design of the amphitheater is notable for the tensile fabric membranes that hover over the theater. The amphitheater has played host to a wide range of concerts, including classical music, country music (e.g., The Aldridge Sisters), blues (e.g., Clarence "Gatemouth" Brown), and rock bands (e.g., Weezer and Widespread Panic). Together with the Sunsphere, the 1400-seat amphitheater is one of only two structures that remain from the 1982 World's Fair.

The amphitheater was condemned to demolition in 2002 but was renovated between 2005 and 2007, reopening in 2007 with then-Mayor Bill Haslam's inaugural address for his second term. The amphitheater was voted one of the top 15 architectural works of East Tennessee by the East Tennessee chapter of the American Institute of Architects, and since its reopening in 2007, the amphitheater continues to be used for concerts (e.g., Logan Brill) and by arts organizations in Knoxville, including the Knoxville Symphony Orchestra, Knoxville Opera and the Tennessee Children's Dance Ensemble.

== See also ==
- List of contemporary amphitheatres
