= Sunsphere =

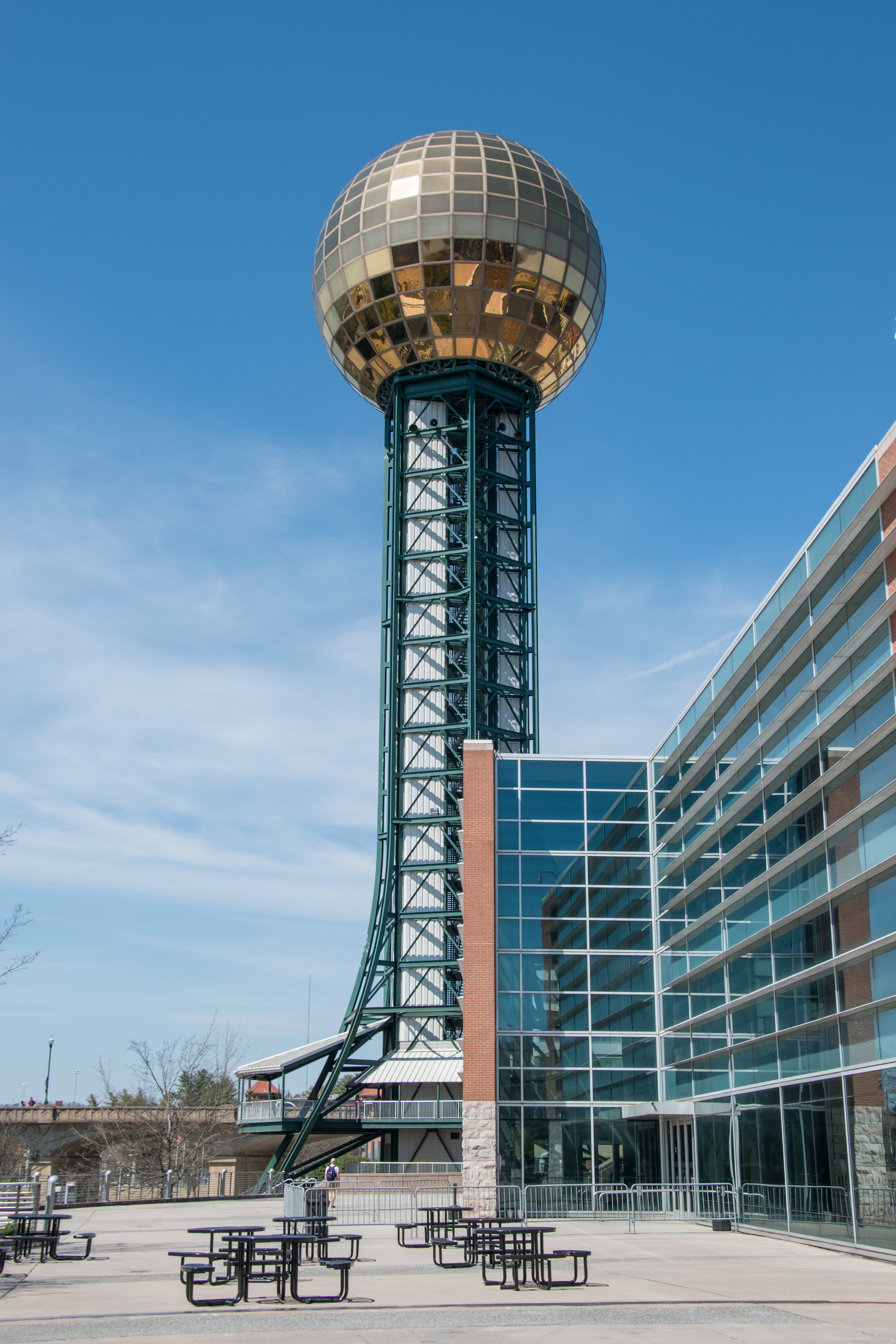

General information
- Type: Observation tower
- Architectural style: Modernism, High-tech
- Location: 963 World's Fair Park Drive; Knoxville, Tennessee; 37916
- Coordinates: 35.9617°N 83.9232°W
- Construction started: 1981
- Completed: 1982
- Opened: May 1, 1982; 44 years ago
- Owner: City of Knoxville

Height
- Roof: 81.07 m (266.0 ft)

Design and construction
- Architects: Don Shell (et alii)
- Structural engineer: Stanley D. Lindsey and Associates, Ltd.

Website
- worldsfairpark.org/sunsphere

The Sunsphere is a 266-foot (81 m) tall hexagonal steel truss structure located in World's Fair Park in downtown Knoxville, Tennessee, United States. It is topped with the 75-foot (23 m) gold-colored glass sphere that served as the symbol of the 1982 World's Fair. Directly across a man-made pond from the Tennessee Amphitheater, they are the only remaining structures from the fair.

== Design ==
Designed by the Knoxville-based architectural firm Community Tectonics, the Sunsphere was noted for its unique design in several engineering publications. It was originally to have had a diameter of 86.5 feet (26.4 m) – symbolically that of the hypothetical 865,000-mile (1,392,000 km) diameter of the disc of the Sun. The tower's window glass panels are layered in 24-karat gold dust and cut to seven different shapes. It weighs 600 short tons (540 t) and features six double steel truss columns in supporting the seven-story sphere. The tower has a volume of 203,689 cubic feet (5,767.8 m^{3}) and a surface of 16,742 square feet (1,555.4 m^{2}).

== History ==
=== World's Fair (1982) ===
During the fair it cost US$2 (equivalent to $6.67 in 2025) to take the elevator to the tower's observation deck. The tower served as a restaurant and featured food items such as the "Sunburger" and a rum and fruit juice cocktail called the "Sunburst". In the early morning hours on May 12, 1982, a shot was fired from outside the fair site and shattered one of the sphere's windows. No one was arrested for the incident.

=== Redevelopment proposals (1991-1999) ===
In March 1991, officials from the Pensacola Tornados of the Continental Basketball Association were looking at Knoxville for possible location and said of the Sunsphere as potential office space, "What better place for basketball offices than a giant gold basketball in the sky."

In March 1994, the World's Fair Park Development Committee sought to reopen the Sunsphere as a restaurant similar to Seattle's Space Needle, which features a restaurant at the top. CEB Enterprises would have opened a casual dining restaurant called World's Fare Restaurant while Cierra Restaurant Group would have opened a fine dining restaurant. Both proposals failed.

The Sunsphere was proposed to be included as part of the new Knoxville Convention Center. While not physically incorporated into the final design, the Convention Center was designed with an open curve along its north edge to allow access to the Sunsphere. During construction of the Convention Center, the observation deck – which the city had briefly reopened, still sporting the original World's Fair-era displays and explanations of the panorama – was closed while the tower was commandeered by the Knoxville Public Building Authority as offices for, quite literally, overseeing construction of the Convention Center.

=== Reopening and recent changes (2007–present) ===
The Level 4 observation deck was reopened on July 5, 2007, to give visitors a view of Knoxville. The observation deck can hold 86 people. At the time of its reopening, Level 5 became a cafe with concession and an early evening drinks service. Level 6 served as an open space leased out for functions. As of October 2013, both the 7th and 8th floors are available for commercial rental.

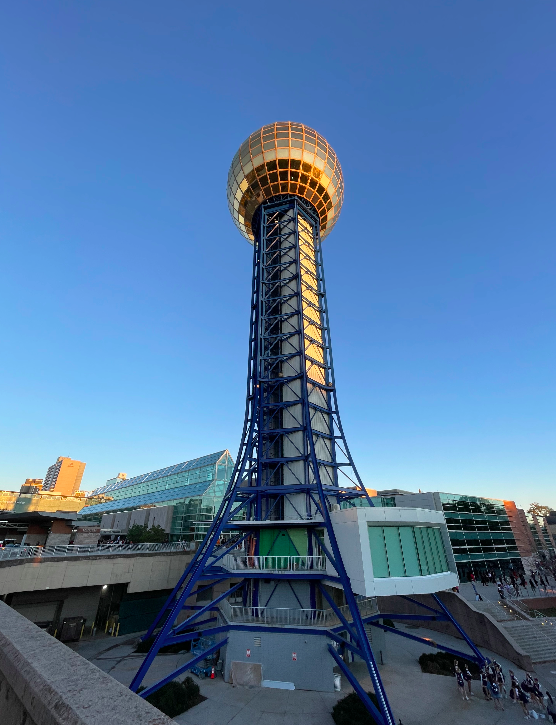
In 2023, the Sunsphere was painted back to its original color.

On August 27, 2008, the 5th floor was opened as the SkyBox bar and lounge. It eventually closed, however, and real estate investor Tony Capiello opened Icon Ultra Lounge in its place, investing $450,000.

In June 2013, a patron accidentally broke an inside window; nobody was hurt. On November 13, 2013, it was announced that Visit Knoxville would update and renovate the 4th floor of the observation deck.

The Sunsphere observation deck was closed in 2020 due to the COVID-19 pandemic. Visit Knoxville reopened the Sunsphere observation deck on February 22, 2022. The floor offers a 360-degree view stretching from downtown to the Great Smoky Mountains, including World's Fair Park, the Tennessee River, and the University of Tennessee Campus. Visitors can also view a 1982 World's Fair timeline, gallery, memorabilia, and gift shop.

In 2023, the Sunsphere's lower steel truss was painted back to its original Pantone color Classic Blue 19-4052 TCX; other improvements from the mid-2020s include the addition of a welcome center and a lighting project.

== In popular culture ==
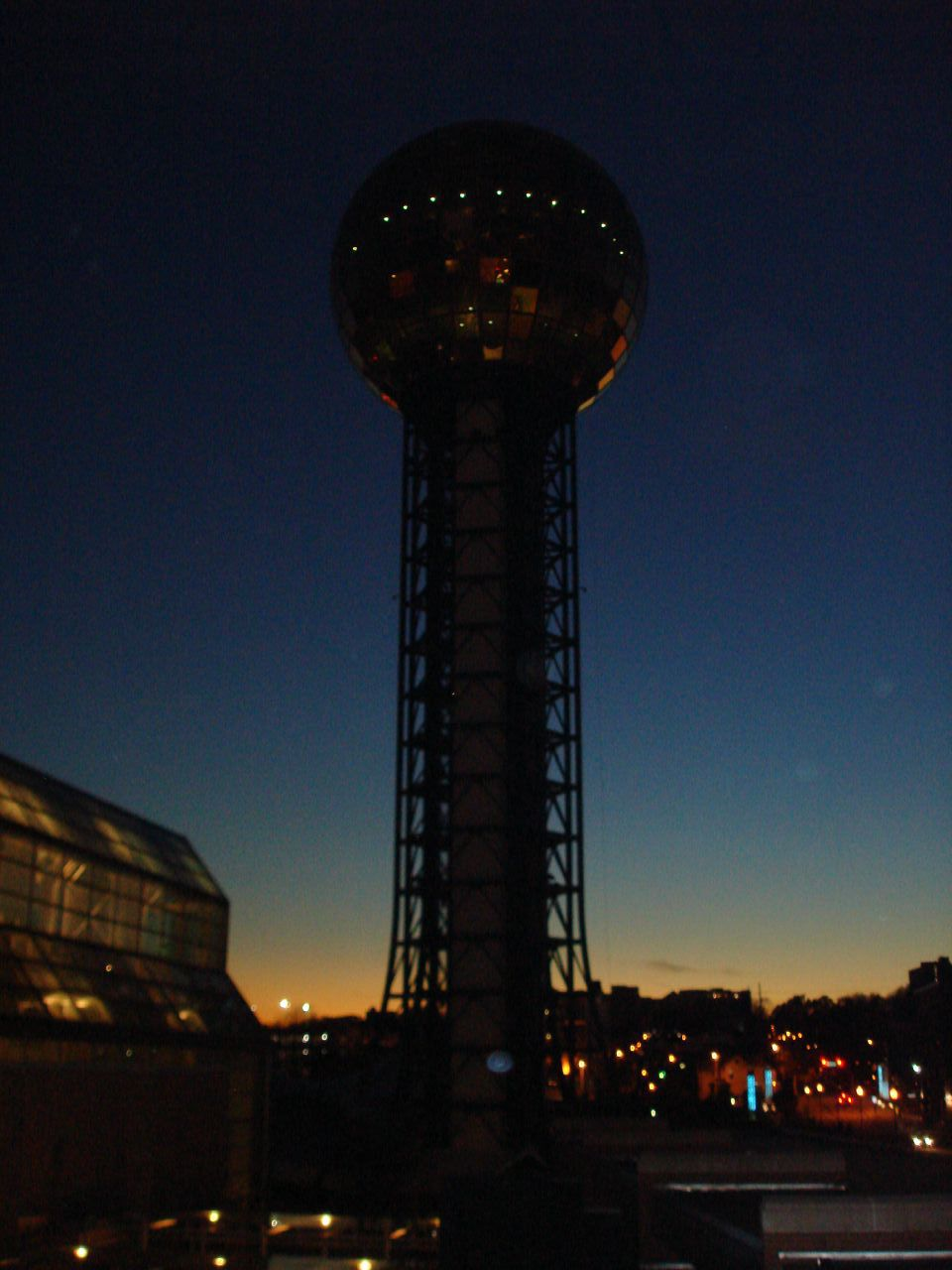
The Sunsphere at night, with the Convention Center visible in the foreground

A March 1996 episode of The Simpsons, "Bart on the Road", features the Sunsphere. Bart and three friends (Nelson, Martin, and Milhouse) travel to Knoxville to visit the World's Fair, only to learn they are over a decade too late. In the episode, the Sunsphere has become a dilapidated storage warehouse for a wig store called the Wigsphere. Nelson then throws a rock at the Sunsphere, causing it to topple over and land on top of their rental car, destroying it and stranding them in Knoxville. As of 2024, a script of the episode, alongside Simpsons-inspired memorabilia, is on display in the real Sunsphere.

Moreover, the Sunsphere has been used as a symbol for Knoxville, appearing in postcards and logos. Between 1993 and 1999, the Sunsphere was featured in part on the logo for the Knoxville Smokies minor league baseball club. The 2002 AAU Junior Olympics mascot Spherit took its inspiration from the landmark. It featured red hair and a body shaped like the Sunsphere.

On Sunday, May 14, 2000, nuclear weapons protesters scaled the tower and hung a large banner saying "Stop the Bombs". They remained on the tower for three days before surrendering to police.

The Sunsphere has also been called "The Lord's Golf Tee".
