= Knoxville Convention Center =

Convention center in Knoxville, Tennessee

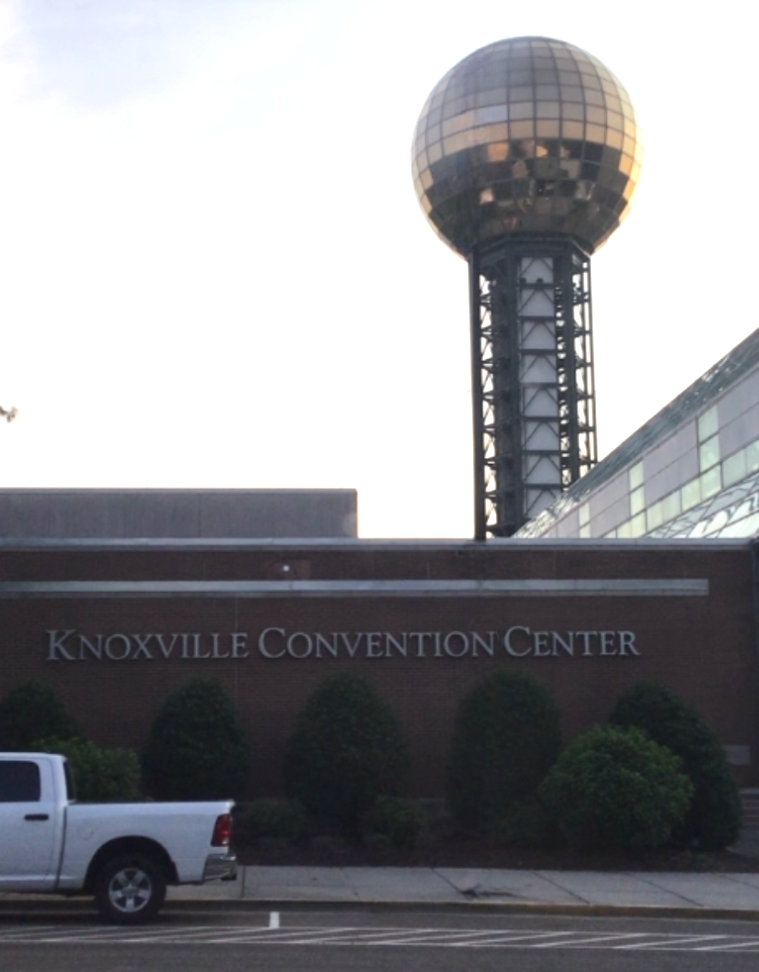
- Knoxville Convention Center with the Sunsphere in the background
- Interactive map of Knoxville Convention Center
- Address: 701 Henley Street
- Location: Knoxville, Tennessee
- Coordinates: 35°57′39.3″N 83°55′22.3″W
- Owner: City of Knoxville
- Operator: ASM Global
- Public transit: Knoxville Area Transit

Construction
- Built: 2002
- Opened: 2002

Website
- kccasm.com

The Knoxville Convention Center is a 500,000-square-foot convention center in Knoxville, Tennessee, occupying the former location of the US Pavilion of the 1982 World's Fair. It offers 120,000 square feet (11,000 m^{2}) of exhibit space.

== Design ==
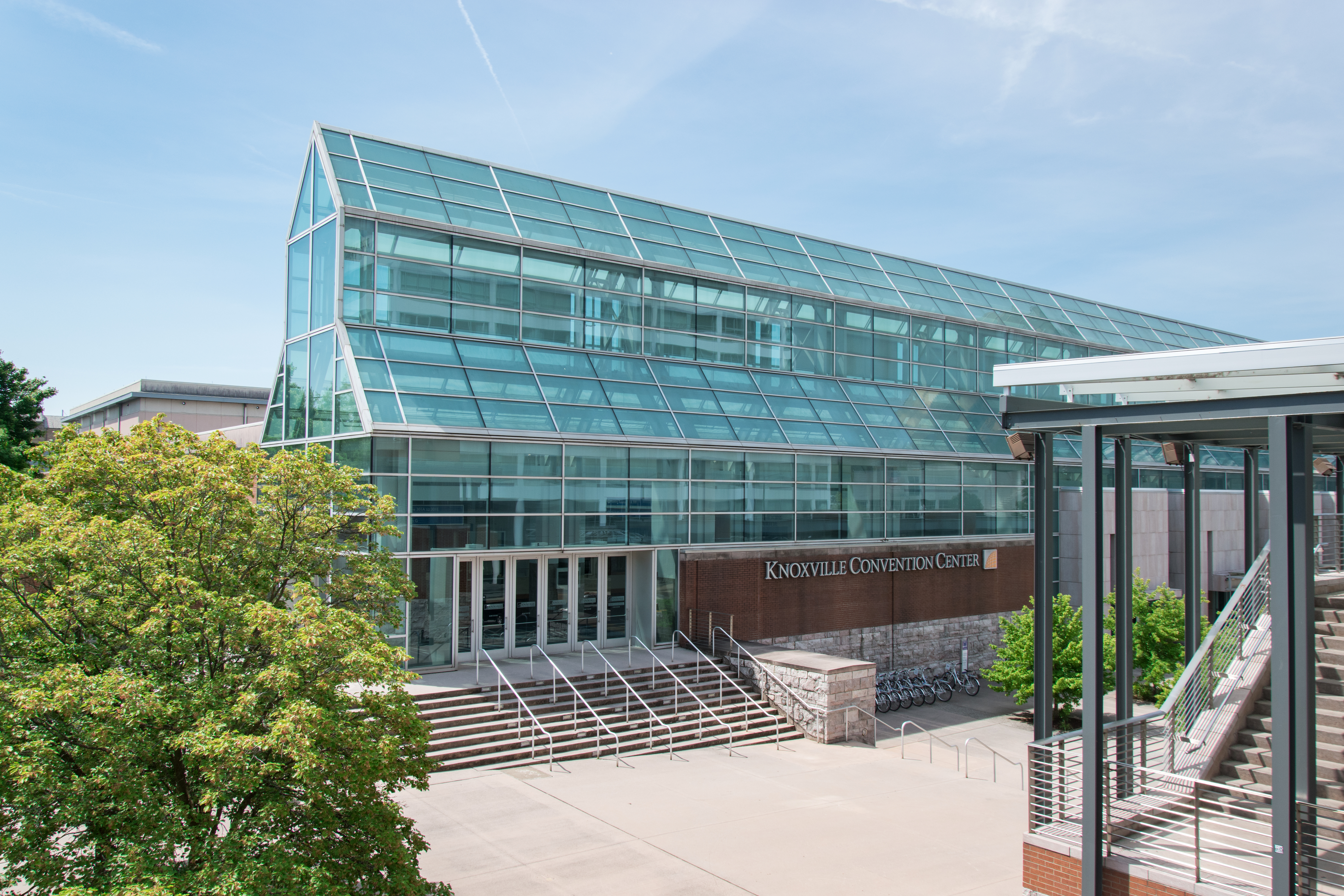
The main entrance as seen from an overhead pedestrian walkway.

The building was designed by the architecture firms Thompson, Ventulett, Stainback & Associates and McCarthy, Holsaple, McCarty. C.M. Kling & Associates were lighting designers. Its design was inspired by that of a Tennessee barn. It contains an exhibit hall, meeting rooms, auditorium, and a large ballroom. Its ballroom measures 27,000 square feet.

== Notable Events ==
Starting in 1988, the convention center annually has hosted the Knoxville Auto Show. Organized by the Knoxville News Sentinel, the trade show showcases cars from several manufacturers along with the latest automotive technology along with concept cars.

On June 11, 2022, the National Wrestling Alliance (NWA), a professional wrestling promotion owned by Billy Corgan, held their Alwayz Ready pay-per-view show at the convention center followed by Knox Out on June 12, 2022 which was a six-part television taping special for the NWA's weekly shows Powerrr and NWA USA.

On January 31, 2023, the NWA would return to the convention center for the first Powerrr episode to be broadcast live which would act as the finale of the NWA Champions Series tournament.
