= Wallace O. Hawkins =

American football coach, athletics administrator (1898–1988)

Biographical details
- Born: May 1, 1898
- Died: November 16, 1988 (aged 90); Dayton, Ohio, U.S.

Playing career

Football
- c. 1920: Knoxville

Baseball
- c. 1920: Knoxville
- Positions: Quarterback (football); Second baseman (baseball)

Coaching career (HC unless noted)

Football
- 1928–1942: Knoxville

Basketball
- c. 1928–1943: Knoxville

Administrative career (AD unless noted)
- 1928–1943: Knoxville

Wallace O. Hawkins Sr. (May 1, 1898 – November 16, 1988) was American college football coach, athletics administrator, and community leader. He served as the head football coach at Knoxville College in Knoxville, Tennessee from 1928 to 1942.

A native of Atlanta, Hawkins attended Knoxville College, where he played football as a quarterback and baseball as a second baseman. He graduated from Knoxville college in 1921, and went to graduate school at the University of Cincinnati during the summers from 1930 to 1933. He also did graduate work at George Williams College in Chicago.

At Knoxville College, Hawkins was the athletic director and the head of the department of health and physical education from 1928 to 1943. He served as executive secretary of the YMCA in Dayton, Ohio from 1947 to 1963. He moved to Zanesville, Ohio, where was the executive director of the Community Center until 1967. That year, he was appointed as a relocation officer for an industrial park development project.

Hawkins died on November 16, 1988, at Miami Valley Hospital in Dayton.

== Head coaching record ==
=== Football ===
Year	Team	Overall	Conference	Standing	Bowl/playoffs
Knoxville Bulldogs (Southern Intercollegiate Athletic Conference) (1928–1942)
1928	Knoxville	3–2–4	2–1–3	5th	
1929	Knoxville	2–6–2			
1930	Knoxville		1–2		
1931	Knoxville	4–3–1	3–2	4th	
1932	Knoxville	2–7	0–6		
1933	Knoxville	0–8			
1934	Knoxville	2–4–1	1–3–1	11th	
1935	Knoxville	1–5–3	0–5–1	10th	
1936	Knoxville	4–3	2–2		
1937	Knoxville	6–3–1	3–2–1	6th	
1938	Knoxville	0–8–1	0–7–1	12th	
1939	Knoxville	4–4–1	3–4–1	9th	
1940	Knoxville		2–3–1	8th	
1941	Knoxville	2–3–2	1–3–2		
1942	Knoxville	0–7	0–7	12th	
Knoxville:					
Total:					
