= Fire Station No. 5 (Knoxville, Tennessee) =

- U.S. National Register of Historic Places
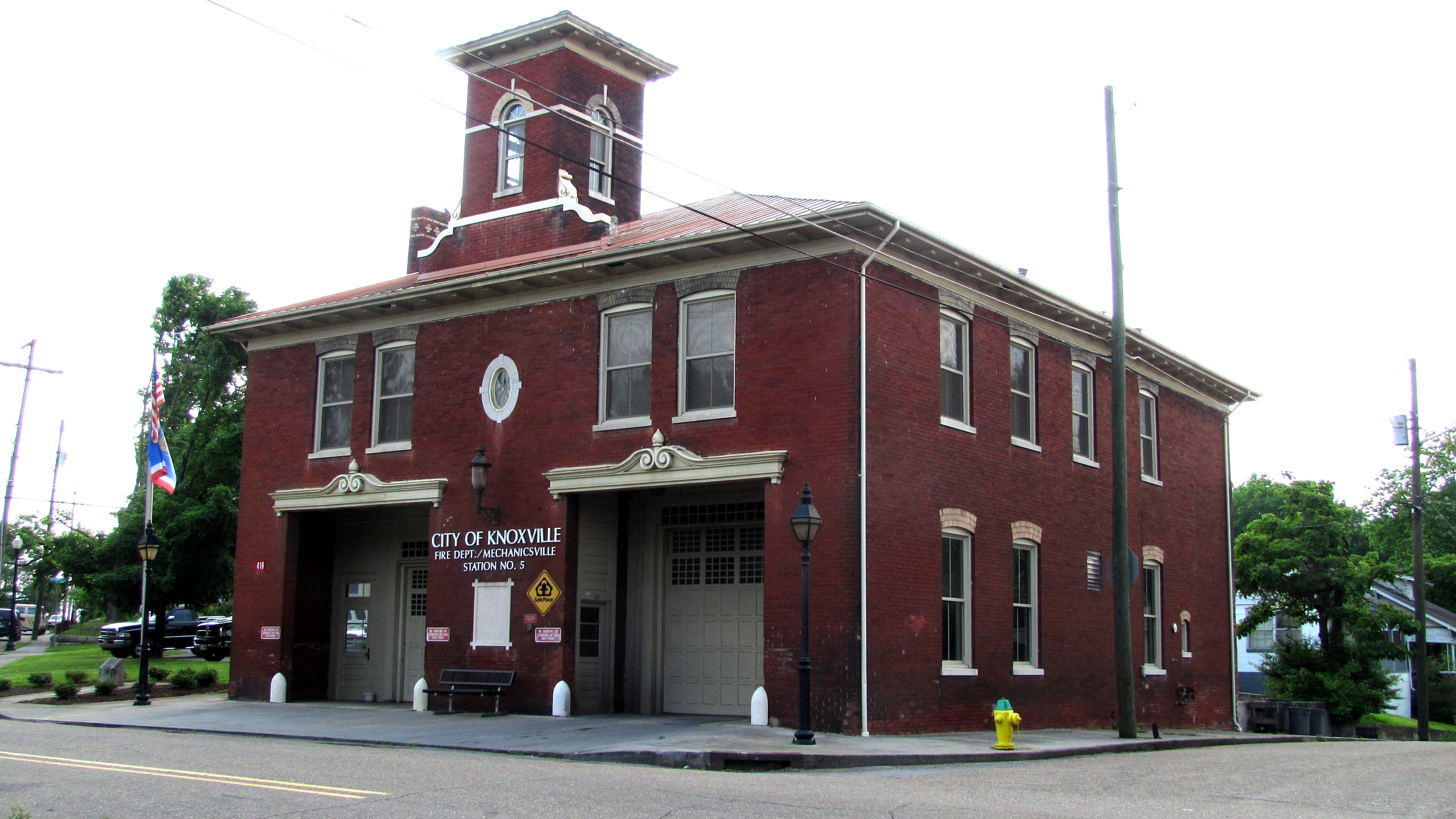

- Location within Tennessee
- Location: 419 Arthur St., NW, Knoxville, Tennessee
- Coordinates: 35°58′9″N 83°55′55″W
- Area: 0.3 acres (0.12 ha)
- Built: 1909
- NRHP reference No.: 78002602
- Added to NRHP: November 2, 1978

The Mechanicsville Fire Station Number 5 is the oldest active fire station in Knoxville, Tennessee. Opened on May 23, 1909, it has served the Mechanicsville community of Knoxville almost continuously since. The fire station was the last in Knoxville to be built specifically for horse-drawn fire apparatus.

Knoxville Fire Department Station number 5 opened on May 23, 1909. It is located at 419 Arthur Street in the Mechanicsville community, just northwest of the downtown area. Station number 5 was listed on the National Register of Historic Places in 1978. KFD Engine 5 is currently housed at this station. Engine 5 is the 4th busiest company in the Knoxville Fire Department.
