= Samuel J. W. Spurgeon =

American minister, newspaper publisher (1861–?)

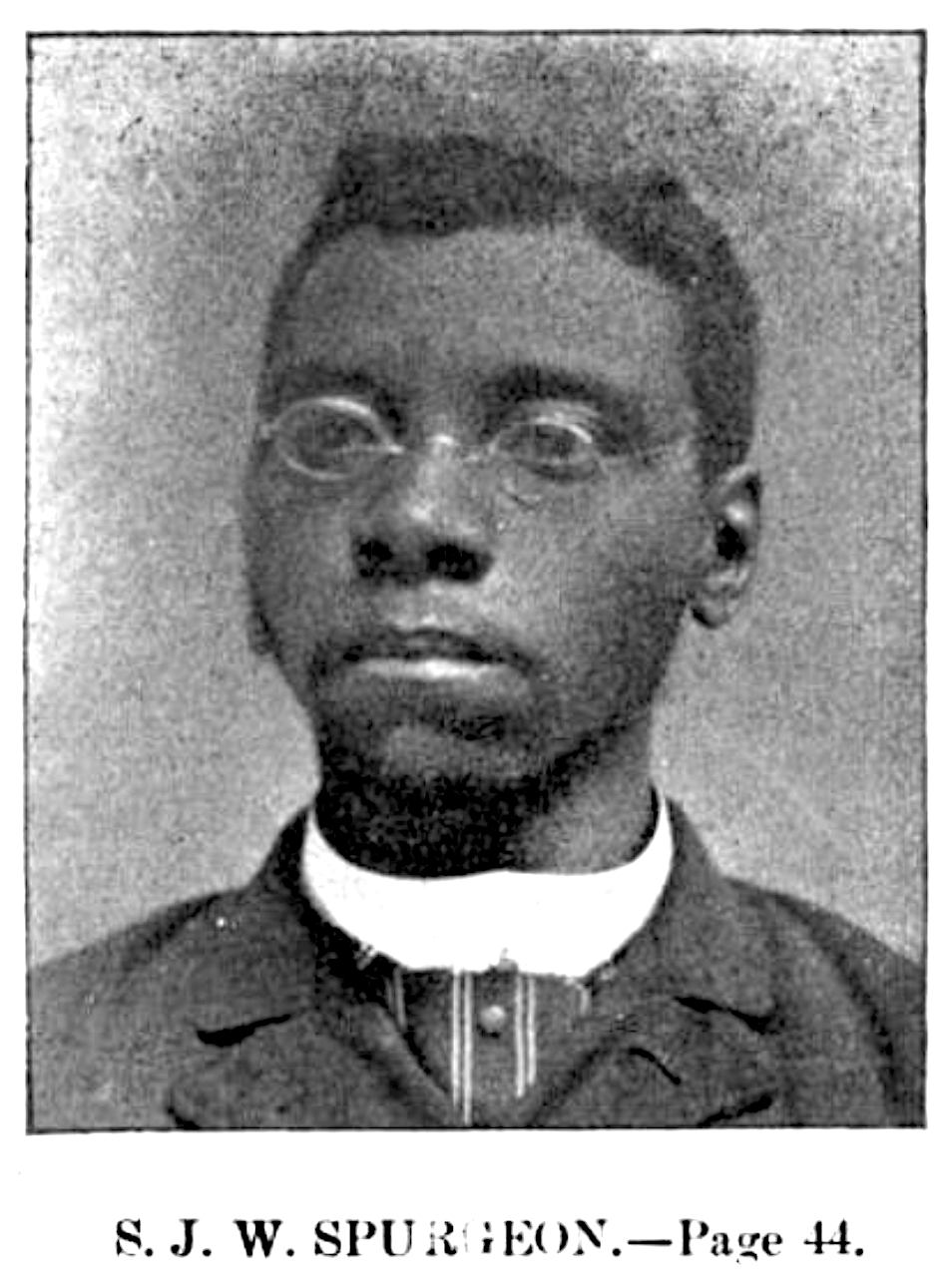
- Born: Samuel James Wheeler Spurgeon; October 25, 1861; Sullivan County, Tennessee, U.S.
- Died: Death date unknown, sometime after 1897
- Education: Knoxville College
- Occupations: Minister, publisher, editor, blacksmith

Samuel James Wheeler Spurgeon (October 25, 1861 – death date unknown) was an American minister, a publisher, and editor. He founded and edited the Christian Worker; and was a contributing editor of The Messenger, a weekly published in Lexington, Kentucky.

== Life and career ==
Samuel James Wheeler Spurgeon was born on October 25, 1861, in Sullivan County, Tennessee. After the American Civil War ended his parents moved to Knoxville, Tennessee when he was a young child, where he worked at Knoxville Iron Works as a water boy. He attended a district school where he learned to read and write, followed by studies at a public school. Spurgeon attended Knoxville College.

In 1883, Spurgeon was ordeained as a minister in Knoxville, Tennessee. He was of the African Methodist Episcopal Zion (AMEZ) faith. Spurgeon worked as a minister at the Constitution Street Christian Church in Lexington, Kentucky (now East Second Street Christian Church of the Christian Church (Disciples of Christ)). He also worked for many years as a minister at a Christian church in Mount Sterling, Kentucky.

Spurgeon founded and edited the Christian Worker; and was a contributing editor of The Messenger, a weekly published in Lexington, Kentucky.
