= Knoxville College =

Historically black college in Knoxville, Tennessee, U.S.

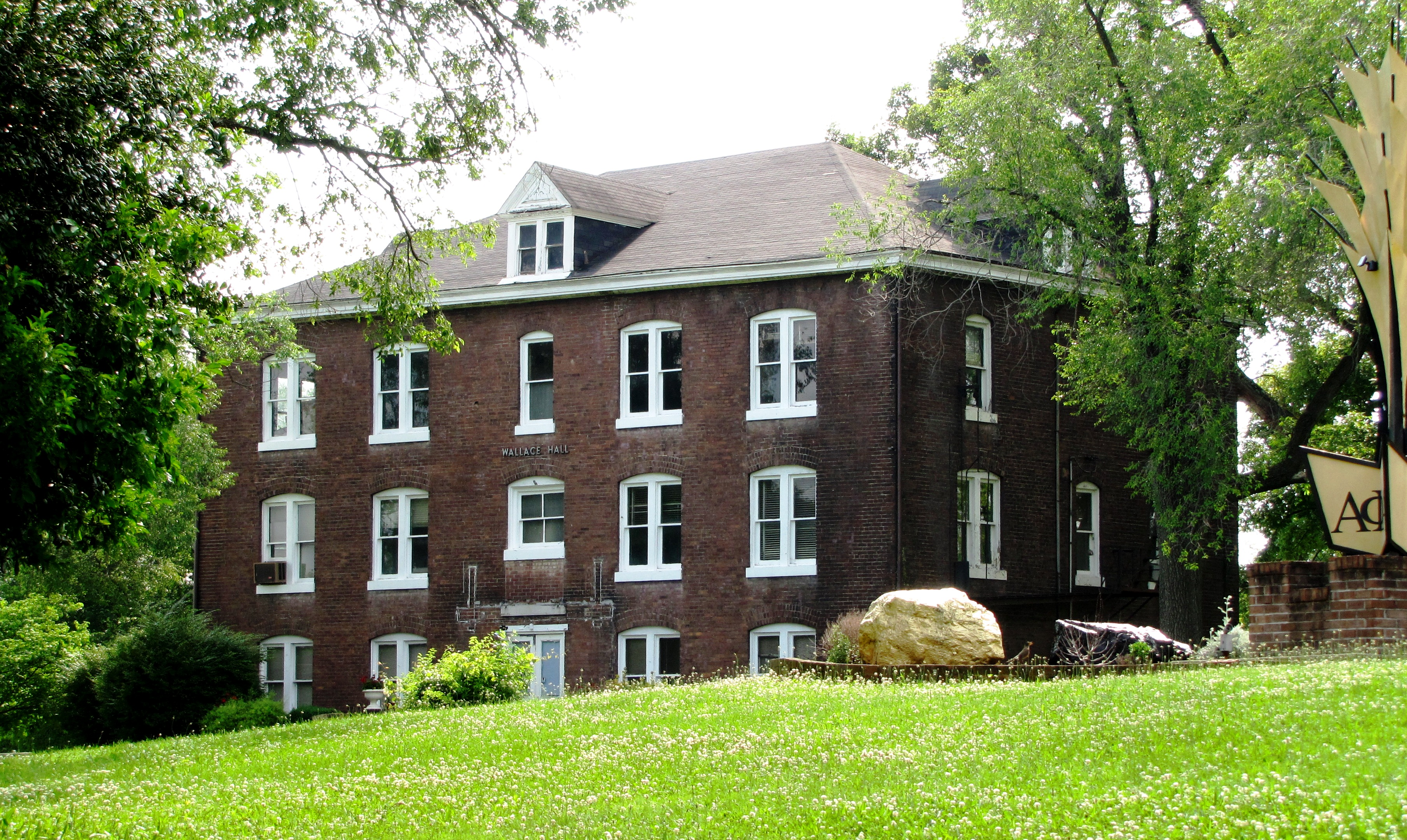
- Motto: Let There Be Light
- Type: Private historically black college
- Established: December 16, 1875
- Affiliations: Presbyterian Church (U.S.A.)
- Endowment: $1 million (appx.)
- Chairman: Dr. Eric Barnes
- President: Vacant
- Faculty: 35 (2010)
- Students: 11 (2015)
- Location: Knoxville, Tennessee, United States; 35°58′12″N 83°56′45″W
- Campus: Urban, 39 acres (16 ha)
- Colors: Garnet and blue
- Nickname: Bulldogs
- Website: www.knoxvillecollege.edu

Knoxville College is an unaccredited private historically black college in Knoxville, Tennessee, United States. It was founded in 1875 by the United Presbyterian Church of North America. The college is a United Negro College Fund member school.

A slow period of decline began in the 1970s and by 2015 the school had an enrollment of just 11 students. In May 2015, the college suspended classes until Fall 2016 term in hopes of reorganizing. On May 17, 2018, the Tennessee Higher Education Commission gave its approval for Knoxville College to reopen and offer classes. On July 1, 2018, Knoxville College website announced resumption of enrolling students for fall 2018 semester. In May 2022, three students graduated.

== History ==
=== Origins and establishment ===
Knoxville College is rooted in a mission school established in Knoxville in 1864 by R. J. Creswell of the United Presbyterian Church to educate the city's free Black and formerly enslaved people. This school initially met in the First Baptist Church building (which at the time was located on Gay Street) before moving to a permanent facility in East Knoxville in 1866. Despite low support from city leadership and threats from poor whites, the school's enrollment gradually grew to over 100. In addition to black students, the school also had many white students until 1901, when Tennessee passed a law forcibly segregating all schools.

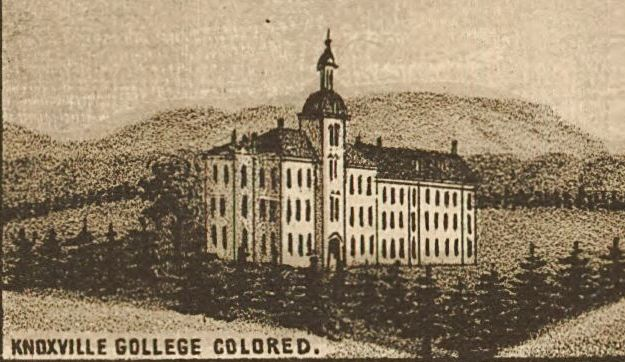
Knoxville College, as it appeared on an 1886 map of Knoxville

In the 1870s, the church's Freedmen's Mission, which had established mission schools for freed slaves across the South, refocused efforts on building a larger, better-equipped school in Knoxville, in part due to stiff competition from other denominations in Nashville. In 1875, the church sold its East Knoxville property and purchased its current property, which at the time consisted of a hill that had been occupied by a Confederate battery during the Civil War. The school's first building, McKee Hall, named for O.S. McKee, was completed in 1876, and the school opened in December of that year. Former governor William G. Brownlow and gubernatorial candidate William F. Yardley spoke at the opening ceremonies.

John Schouller McCulloch was named the school's first principal and Eliza B. Wallace was named the school's principal of female students. The new school was primarily a normal school, which trained teachers, but also operated an academy for the education of local children. In 1877, the school was designated a college by the state, to the surprise of McCulloch, as few of the school's students were ready for a college-level curriculum. In 1890, the state designated the school the recipient of its Morrill Act funds for blacks, with which the school established mechanical and agricultural departments.

==== Medical department (1895–1900) ====
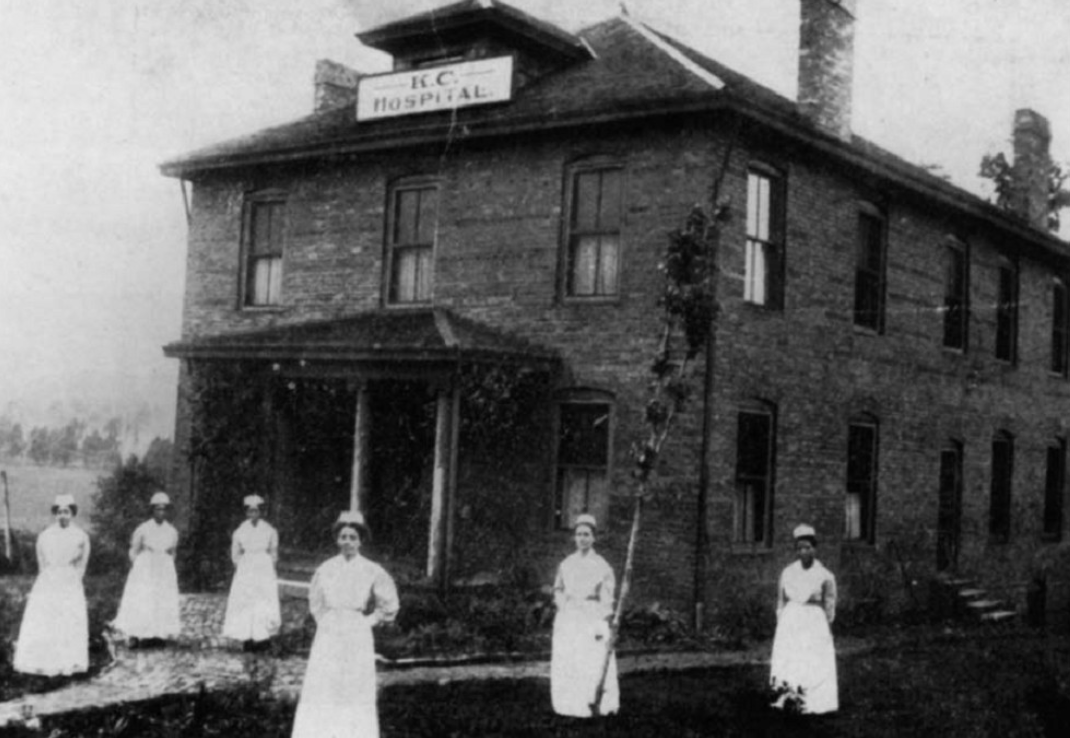
Knoxville College Hospital (circa 1907)

There were no medical schools for African Americans prior to the American Civil War, which lasted to 1865. Knoxville College had an early medical department for black students, open from 1895 until 1900. The Knoxville College medical department was created through the donation of the "Colored Department" at the University of Tennessee; the "Colored Department" had been founded by the United Presbyterian Church in 1887 for medical training. William Wallace Derrick had been an African American faculty member at Knoxville College and helped establish the short lived medical department. The Knoxville College Hospital was opened in 1907 at 1825 College Street.

After the department closed, the city of Knoxville organized a replacement black medical school in the winter of 1900, named the Knoxville Medical College and led by the city physician, Henry Morgan Green.

=== Development and expansion ===
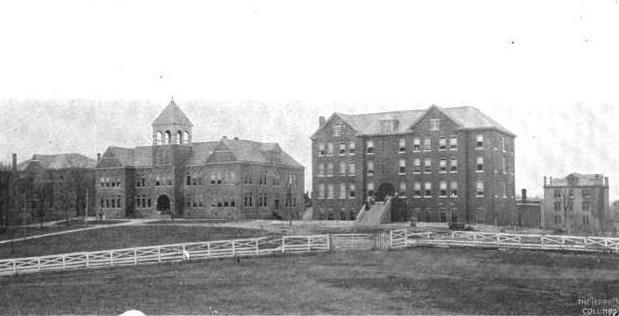
Knoxville College in the early 20th century

In 1901, Knoxville College finally received a state charter. Six years later, the school established the Eliza B. Wallace Hospital, which served a dual purpose of training nurses and tending to the health needs of the local black community. This proved invaluable during the city's Influenza outbreak of 1918.

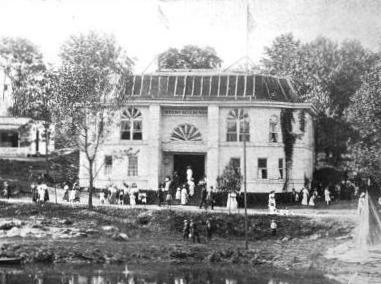
The Negro Building at the Appalachian Exposition (1910 to 1911), designed and built by John Henry Michael, Knoxville College faculty and students

In 1913, John Henry Michael, the head of the school's mechanical department, designed the "Negro Building" for the National Conservation Exposition, which was held across town at Chilhowee Park. The building, which is no longer standing, was constructed with the help of Knoxville College students. During World War I, Knoxville College students helped raise money for liberty bonds and the Red Cross. In the aftermath of the Riot of 1919, one of the city's worst racial episodes, the school's administration (comprising black and white members) staunchly defended the city's African American community, and praised its students' restraint.

J. Kelly Giffen, president of the institution from 1918 to 1936, spearheaded development of an internationally acclaimed music program with students performing at concerts across the United States; the revenues raised aided an expansion of the campus. In 1925, students staged a month-long boycott of classes to protest the school's strict behavioral code, culminating in an all-night negotiating session between student leaders and the school's dean, Herbert Telford. Telford agreed to relax some rules, and allowed the creation of a student council. Under Giffen, the athletic program was further developed; a football field and stadium were built in 1924, followed by a gymnasium in 1927, which allowed the introduction of varsity basketball.

The college was significantly challenged by the Depression and World War II, with the effects exacerbated by leadership instability. In October 1940, John A. Cotton was appointed temporary president, becoming the college's first Black leader and the first alumnus to lead the institution. In May 1942, following an incapacitating heart attack, he resigned on health grounds and died from another heart attack the following year. In November 1942, William Lloyd Imes became the second alumnus and first regular Black president of Knoxville College, taking office the following April. Imes resigned to return to his ministry in June 1947, and was succeeded by John Reed Miller, who oversaw the modernization of the college's buildings; under Miller, Knoxville College secured an "A" rating in December 1949 from the Southern Association of Colleges and Schools (SACS). By Miller's departure in August 1950, however, the college had sold portions of its land to raise funds and was on the verge of bankruptcy.

James A. Colston, who assumed the presidency in June 1951, orchestrated a successful turnaround and expansion of the college. During his 15-year tenure, Knoxville College enjoyed financial stability and unprecedented growth. In 1957, it became among the first predominantly black institutions admitted to full membership in the Southern Association of Colleges and Schools (SACS). Throughout the summer of 1960, students engaged in a series of sit-ins to protest segregation at lunch counters in downtown Knoxville, eventually convincing most downtown businesses to integrate. The school's charter was amended in 1962 to allow the admission of white students. In the decade after Colston took office, Knoxville College saw enrollment more than double from 267 students to 652 in 1961, with the number of faculty rising from 20 to 39. By 1964, a faculty residence, a student union and cafeteria, four dormitories, and a science building had been built. In 1966, Colston left to become the president of Bronx Community College; by then, Knoxville College had ten new buildings, a population of 907 students, and 198 faculty.

=== Instability, decline, and period of rejuvenation ===
In November 1966, Robert L. Owens III, formerly dean of the graduate school at Southern University, succeeded Colston as president and took office in February 1967. His controversial tenure, ending with his forced resignation in June 1971, burdened the college's finances. As the college lacked modern athletic facilities, Owens oversaw construction of a new gymnasium and football stadium. The construction projects, however, increased the college's debt burden, notably the construction of the 10-story Martin Luther King Jr. Towers, a coeducational dormitory and dining facility that opened in November 1969 and cost approximately $4 million. To recover the costs of the new dormitory towers, Knoxville College under Owens recruited students, raising enrollments to a peak of about 1,300 students in 1970, but placing strains on the college's environment; it was subsequently found that some of those enrolled were ineligible for admission, forcing the college administration to expel over 200 students. The college reportedly came close to losing accreditation in 1970.

As with other HBCUs during the 1970s, Knoxville College's existing financial challenges were worsened by competition from better funded and predominantly white institutions, general increases in operating costs, and the effects of the 1973–1975 recession. In addition, funding from the Presbyterian Church declined, and a succession of short and unstable administrations sent the institution into an over decade-long decline.

=== Accreditation loss, reorganization attempts, and closure ===
June 1, 1997, the Southern Association of Colleges and Schools withdrew Knoxville College's accreditation; enrollment dropped precipitously and the school's financial situation became dire. As enrollment plummeted, the school's debt skyrocketed and it was soon unable to pay its faculty or electric bills. Throughout the rest of the 1990s, as enrollment plummeted, most campus buildings were shuttered and abandoned, with most degree programs being discontinued. In August 2005, the school's Board of Trustees fired the school's president, Barbara Hatton.

Following Hatton's removal, the school's alumni association embarked on an aggressive fundraising campaign in 2006 and 2007 to save the college and return it to solvency. In January 2010, the school hired Horace A. Judson as interim president. Judson implemented a new strategic plan with the following goals: (1) regain accreditation, (2) achieve fiscal stability, (3) develop academic program distinctiveness, (4) develop a department of enrollment management, (5) develop a quality student-centered living and learning environment, and (6) establish new relationships and strengthen former ones among key constituents.

However, Judson soon left and the college continued to struggle. On June 9, 2014, the Environmental Protection Agency seized control of the long-shuttered A.K. Stewart Science Hall to conduct an emergency clean-up of toxic chemicals that the college had improperly stored in laboratories; In early 2015 state accreditation for the college was withdrawn, further complicating the college's already strained finances. In April 2015, the school announced it was suspending classes for the Fall 2015 term in hopes of reorganizing. Enrollment had dwindled to just 11 students, and the college was struggling to pay back a $4.5 million loan from 2003 and more than $425,000 to the federal government for the Stewart Science Hall cleanup. In May 2015, the school announced classes would resume in the Fall 2016 term.

In May 2016, the Tennessee Department of Environment and Conservation recommended the college become a state Superfund site due to ongoing contamination concerns from the Stewart Science Hall. In September 2016, the City of Knoxville demanded that Knoxville College make repairs to fourteen of its buildings within 90 days or face condemnation. City crews subsequently boarded up the buildings. The Knoxville Fire Department responded to between four and five fires at abandoned buildings on campus in 2016, and estimated that since the buildings began falling into disuse after 1997, they had responded to twenty or thirty such fires there.

As of August 2018, most of the campus sits abandoned, in an advanced state of disrepair. Most buildings are open to vagrants and vandals. This has caused severe damage to the buildings. The former college center has been set on fire twice. Since early 2018, the college administrative offices are back on campus again, occupying the college Annex which is next to McMillan Chapel. Plans have been made to renovate McMillan Chapel and the Alumni Library.

In 2023, Knoxville College's Vice President Dasha Lundy has been on a team working in collaboration with the University of Tennessee, Morris Brown College in Atlanta and other schools, to regain their accreditation by 2024 which is Knoxville College’s main priority now. In August 2024, the college applied for accreditation with the Transnational Association of Christian Colleges and Schools.

== Campus ==
- Knoxville College Historic District
- U.S. National Register of Historic Places
- U.S. Historic district
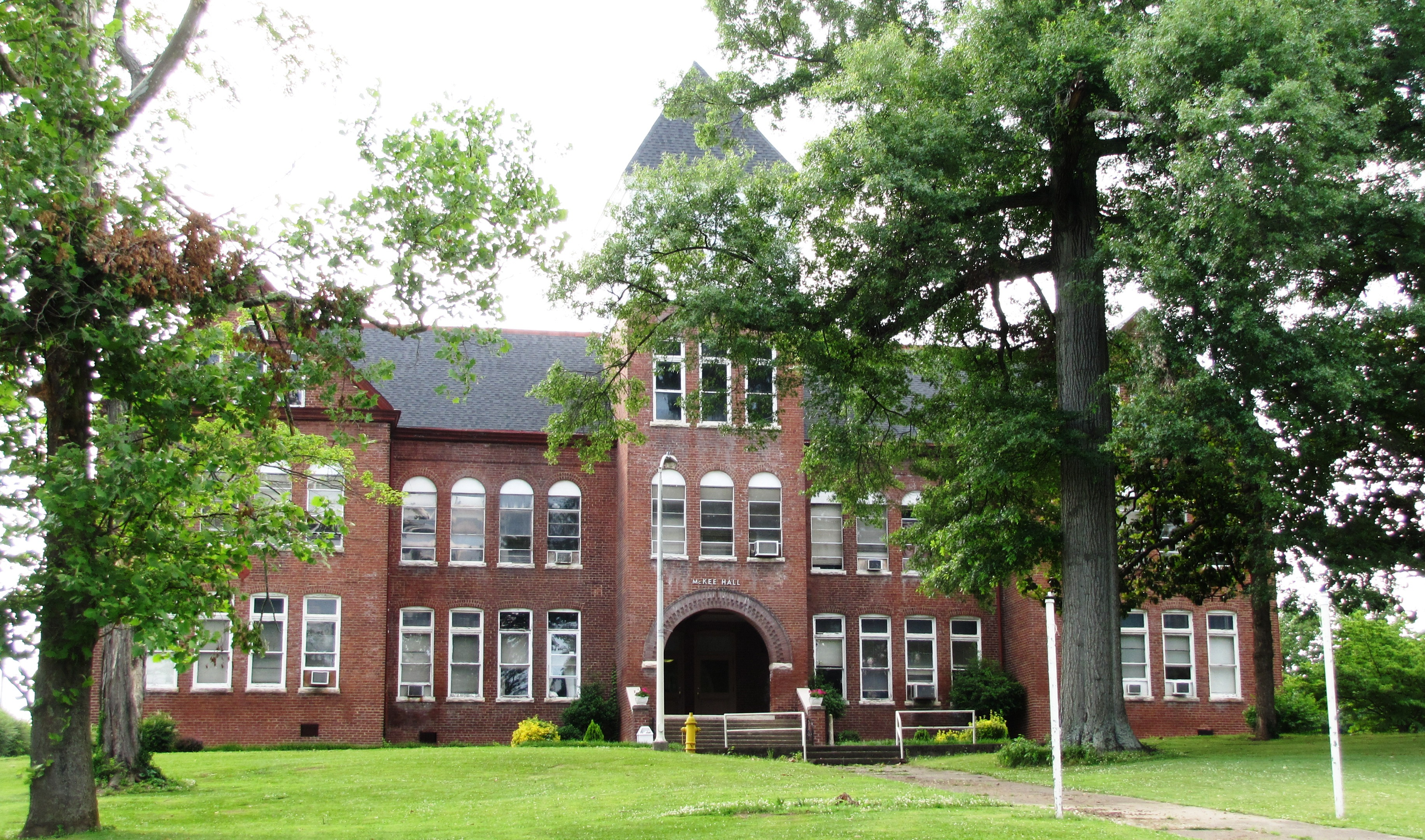
- McKee Hall

- Location within Tennessee Location within the United States
- Area: 14.5 acres (5.9 ha)
- NRHP reference No.: 80003841
- Added to NRHP: May 1, 1980

Knoxville College is situated on a 17-building, 39-acre (16 ha) campus, located atop a hill overlooking the Mechanicsville neighborhood, just northwest of Knoxville's downtown area. Along with administration and classroom buildings, the campus includes a performing arts center, a gymnasium, a library, a chapel, and a student center. The school maintains dormitories for on-campus students, as well as a president's house, and cottages and apartments for faculty.

=== Knoxville College Historic District ===
In 1980, eight buildings on the Knoxville College campus received recognition for having a role in minority education on the National Register of Historic Places as a historic district. Many of the earliest buildings were constructed using student labor, student-made bricks, and lumber donated by alumni. The district includes the following buildings:

- McKee Hall, the oldest building on campus, originally built in 1876, largely rebuilt in 1895 following a fire. The building is named for O.S. McKee who had established the first school for African-American children in Nashville in 1862. This building currently houses administration offices.
- The President's House, built in the late 1880s. The house was originally built of wood, but brick siding was added in 1905.
- Wallace Hall, built in 1890 as an orphanage. This building is named for Eliza B. Wallace, the school's principal of female students, 1877–1897.
- Elnathan Hall, built in 1898 following the destruction by fire of the original Elnathan Hall, and altered in 1905 and 1971. This building has served variously as a women's dorm, administration building, and classroom building. It was destroyed by fire on November 4, 2024.
- Two Faculty cottages, 1005 and 1009 College Street, both built in the Bungalow style in 1906.
- McMillan Chapel, built in 1913, designed by Knoxville College alumnus, William Thomas Jones. Along with church services, the chapel served as the campus's primary performance venue. Notable guests who have delivered speeches at the chapel include George Washington Carver, Countee Cullen, W. E. B. Du Bois, Jesse Owens, William H. Hastie and Jackie Robinson.
- Giffen Memorial Gymnasium, built in 1929.

In 2016, the preservationist group Knox Heritage placed the Knoxville College Historic District on its "Fragile Fifteen," a list of endangered Knoxville-area historic properties.

=== Freedmen's Mission Historic Cemetery ===
The Freedmen's Mission Historic Cemetery, at the corner of Booker and College, is a historic African-American burial ground on the campus.

== Administration ==
A 16-member board of trustees oversees Knoxville College. Its chairman is Dr. Eric Barnes. The board includes representatives from the Knoxville College National Alumni Association. The board appoints the president, who is the school's chief administrator.

On December 5, 2024, it was announced that Dr. Rotesha Harris would be the college's 32nd President. However, she left the role after less than a year.

=== Leaders ===
(* indicates alumnus)
Name	Tenure
J. P. Wright (Superintendent)	September 1875 – August 1877
John S. McCulloch (President)	August 1877 – July 1899
Ralph W. McGranahan	August 1899 – July 1918
J. Kelly Giffen	August 1918 – July 1936
Samuel M. Laing	October 1936 – October 1940
John A. Cotton*	October 1940 – June 1942
William Lloyd Imes*	November 1942 – June 1947
John Reed Miller	July 1947 – August 1950
R. D. Case (interim)	August 1950 – June 1951
James A. Colston	June 1951 – July 1966
Robert L. Owens III	November 1966 – June 1971
Hardy Liston Jr. (interim)	June 1971 – April 1972
Edward J. Brantley	April 1972 – June 1975
Robert H. Harvey (interim)	June 1975 – July 1976
Rutherford H. Adkins	August 1976 – January 1981

== Academics ==
As of 2010, Knoxville College offered two degrees: the four-year Bachelor of Liberal Studies, and the two year Associate of Arts. The Bachelor of Liberal Studies includes one of four areas of concentration: Humanities, Business and Computer Sciences, Natural Sciences and Mathematics, or Social and Behavioral Sciences. The curriculum further requires 15 to 18 semester hours of specialization within each concentration, providing for a more in-depth understanding of a particular field.

Knoxville College followed a debt-free policy that allowed students to complete the degree program without the accumulation of debt. This was accomplished primarily through its College Work Program, which allowed students to offset much of their tuition costs by working for several hours per week. This program involved a mix of performing various tasks around campus, community involvement, and internship programs.

== Student life ==
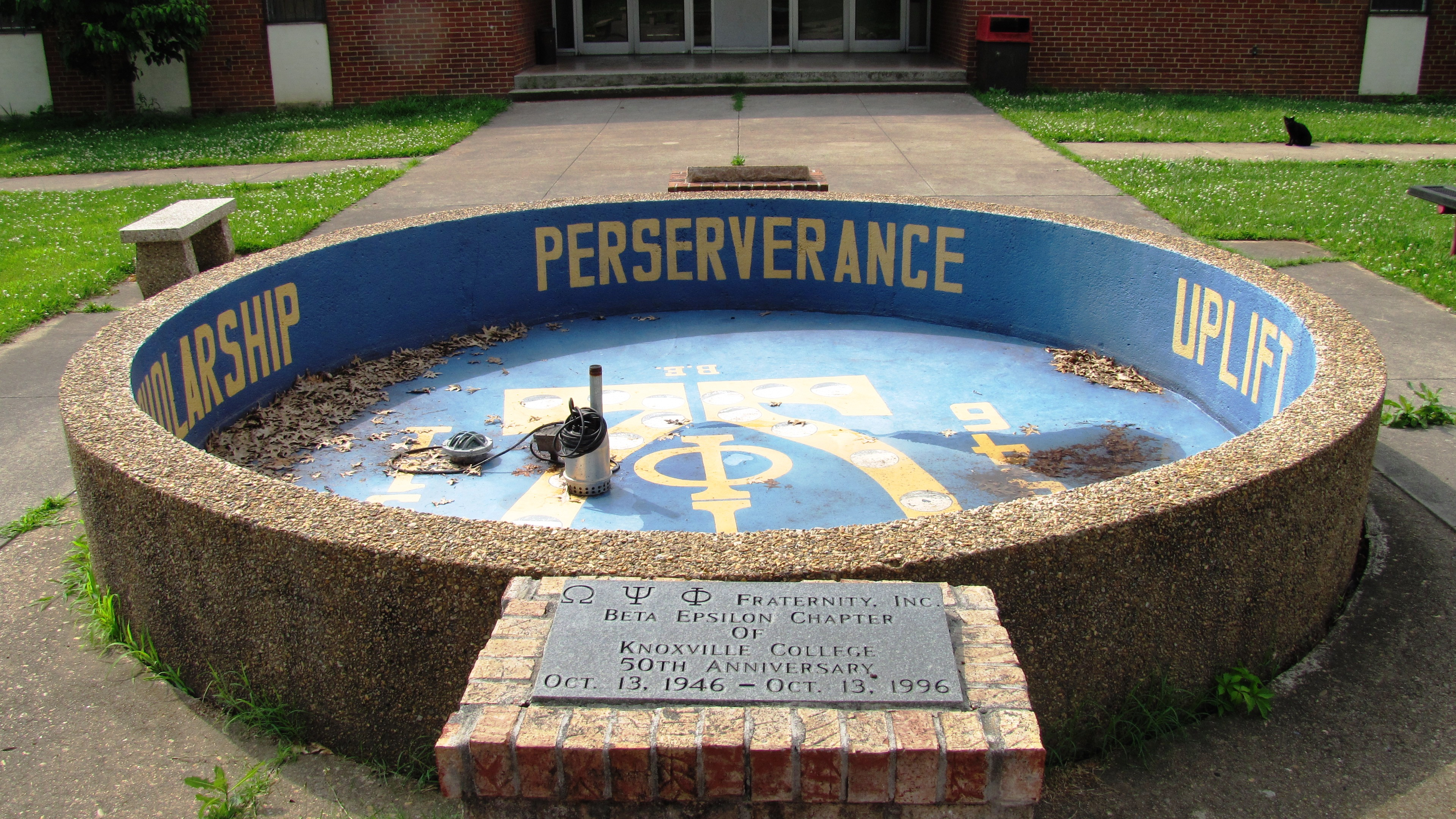
Omega Psi Phi monument

Knoxville College's Student Government Association (SGA), which was elected by the student body, acted as a liaison between students and campus administration. The SGA was led by a president, elected for one term.

Student activities included a dance team, a debate team, a choir, and a trivia team (which competed with other HBCUs in the Honda Bowl Competition). The school's newspaper, The Aurora, was published for over a century. The college also maintained a student ambassador program and wellness program that provided volunteer services for the surrounding community.

After 1997, Knoxville College dropped most athletics programs due to declining enrollment, but as part of its reorganization, hopes to re-establish men's and women's basketball teams, as well as a cheerleading squad.

== Notable alumni ==
Name	Class year	Notability	Reference(s)
William Coffee		Cryptographer	
George E. Curry		Editor-in-chief of the National Newspaper Publishers Association news service (NNPA) and BlackPressUSA.com, and had served as chairman of the board of trustees at Knoxville College	
Michael Eric Dyson	Attended, but transferred	Professor of sociology at Georgetown University, author, media commentator, talk radio show host	
Lillie England Lovinggood	1889?	Writer and teacher	
C. Virginia Fields	1967	Social worker and former Borough President of Manhattan, New York	
Johnny Ford		Mayor of Tuskegee, Alabama	
Jake Gaither	1927	Florida A&M University football coach who won more than 85 percent of his games over a 24-year period, from 1945 to 1969. Member of College Football Hall of Fame	
Grady Jackson	1997	Former defensive tackle in the National Football League	
Vernon Jarrett	1941	First African-American columnist for the Chicago Tribune and former president of the National Association of Black Journalists (NABJ)	
Ken Johnson		Former defensive end in the National Football League	
Lyman T. Johnson		Educator and influential leader of racial desegregation in the state of Kentucky during the 1940s	
Edith Irby Jones		First female president of the National Medical Association	
Mildred Kelly	1949	First Black woman to serve as a US Army sergeant major and command sergeant major	
Willie E. May	1968	Director of the National Institute of Standards and Technology	
Samuel J. W. Spurgeon	1880s	Christian minister, newspaper publisher, and editor	
Ralph Wiley		Noted author, speaker, and sports columnist for The Oakland Tribune, Sports Illustrated, and ESPN	
Palmer Williams Jr.		Actor, recurring role in Tyler Perry's House of Payne	

== See also ==
- Mayers' Industrial School
