= Knoxville Medical College =

American medical college (1900–1910)

Location
- 520 College Street, Knoxville, Tennessee, U.S. 35.967021°N 83.937105°W

Information
- School type: African American medical school
- Established: 1900
- Founder: Henry Morgan Green
- Closed: 1910
- President: Henry Morgan Green
- Dean: E. M. Randall

Knoxville Medical College (1900–1910) was an American medical college segregated for Black students in Mechanicsville neighborhood of Knoxville, Tennessee. It was short lived in part because of its reputation of "mediocrity" in its training, and the for-profit model.

== History ==
After the closure of the medical department at Knoxville College in 1900, Knoxville Medical College was organized as a replacement facility that opened on December 6, 1900 by the City of Knoxville. At the time of its opening, the only other Black medical school in the state was Meharry Medical College in Nashville.

The campus was a single floor in a building, located above an undertaker's business. It was initially located near the corner of College (formerly Clinton Road) and Deaderick streets, now Rogers Memorial Baptist Church. The school did not have a strict admissions requirement and only required a high school diploma. The students had limited clinical training and no campus facilities, and it required visits to the nearby Knoxville New City Hospital.

== Faculty ==
Knoxville Medical College founding president was Henry Morgan Green. The school dean at the time of opening was E. M. Randall, who had served as dean at Knoxville College the year prior. Other faculty members included William Wallace Derrick, a Black physician whom had previously taught at the medical department at Knoxville College; A. G. Edwards; W. H. Moore; John Clear; and J. H. Morton.

== Final year and closure ==
In January 1909, the school was visited by Abraham Flexner who authored the critical Flexner Report (1910) about the state of medical education.

By 1910, Knoxville Medical College was forced to close, most likely due to the poor educational conditions and its reputation for "mediocrity" in its training. The college had graduated 21 students in the 10 years of operations. After the closure of Knoxville Medical College, Lincoln Memorial University bought the college in 1910.
