= Barbara R. Hatton =

American academic administrator (1940/1941–2025)

- Hatton in 1992

President of Knoxville College
- In office 1997 – August 8, 2005
- Succeeded by: Robert H. Harvey (acting)

7th President of South Carolina State University
- In office January 1, 1993 – June 28, 1995
- Preceded by: Carl Carpenter (interim)

Personal details
- Born: 1940 or 1941 LaGrange, Georgia, U.S.
- Died: November 3, 2025 (aged 84–85) Boston, Massachusetts, U.S.
- Children: 1
- Education: Howard University; Atlanta University; Stanford University

Barbara Rose Hatton (1940 or 1941 – November 3, 2025) was an American academic administrator. She served as the president of South Carolina State University from 1993 to 1995 and as the president of Knoxville College from 1997 to 2005.

Hatton earned a bachelor's degree from Howard University, a master's from Atlanta University, and a Ph.D. from Stanford University. Before her presidencies, she held faculty and administrative positions at Stanford University, Tuskegee University, and the Ford Foundation. In 1993, she became the first female president of South Carolina State University. Her tenure ended after 22 months when the board of trustees terminated her, resulting in a lawsuit that Hatton settled with the university. She was later hired to lead Knoxville College, which was struggling with financial issues and had lost its accreditation. Her leadership there ended in 2005 when the board fired her amid lawsuits from faculty and students over unpaid wages.

== Early life and education ==
Barbara Rose Hatton was born in LaGrange, Georgia, the eldest child of William H. Hatton, a lifelong educator and school principal, and Katye Tucker Hatton. She was raised in Atlanta and attended Atlanta Public Schools.

At the age of 14, while a sophomore in high school, Hatton was inspired by a speech from Mary McLeod Bethune, which she later called a "defining moment" that captured her "very dreams". Hatton graduated in 1958 as the valedictorian of her class at Henry McNeal Turner High School.

Hatton earned a B.S. degree in psychology and mathematics from Howard University. She completed an M.A. in education from Atlanta University. At Stanford University, Hatton earned an M.E.A. in business and education and, in 1976, a Ph.D. in education. Her dissertation was titled Schools and Black Communities: A Problem Formulation. In a 2012 interview, Hatton stated that her academic field was administration.

== Career ==
After receiving her bachelor's degree, Hatton worked as a secondary school mathematics teacher at Booker T. Washington High School in Atlanta. She was later employed at the University of the District of Columbia, where she served as a teacher and held administrative positions.

Hatton then joined Stanford University, where she was an assistant professor of education administration and policy studies, as well as an instructor and associate director of the Stanford Urban/Rural School Development Institute. She was the first African American woman to hold a tenure-track position in the School of Education.

Hatton served as the dean of the School of Education at Tuskegee University, where she was the first woman to hold that position. She also served as dean of the School of Education at Atlanta University.

Hatton then worked at the Ford Foundation in New York City, first as a program officer and later as the deputy director of the education and culture program. She left this position in September 1992. While at the foundation, she wrote the grant recommendation to fund the merger that created Clark Atlanta University.

=== South Carolina State University presidency ===
Hatton was appointed the seventh president and first female president of South Carolina State University in September 1992, succeeding interim president Carl A. Carpenter. She officially started her new position on January 1, 1993.

Hatton stated in 2012 that she arrived on a campus that was "in turmoil and disarray" and that she was hired as a "new broom to sweep clean" an "insider culture" of "cronyism, favoritism, [and] corruption." On her first day, she faced three simultaneous crises: a whistleblower lawsuit, an NCAA investigation, and an investigation by the state's legislative audit council. Her vision was to elevate the university to a "triumvirate" of higher education in the state, alongside Clemson University and the University of South Carolina. She initiated the construction of a new football stadium by breaking a stalled project into phases. She obtained $6 million in additional funding for the stadium.

Hatton's tenure ended after 22 months when the board of trustees voted to terminate her on June 28, 1995. The board cited "philosophical differences", and other reports cited a faculty survey documenting low morale. Hatton stated that board members told her the "heart of the concern was... 'a woman thing'". She also noted that the state legislature had restructured the board two years into her presidency, replacing the members who had hired her. Hatton filed a lawsuit following her termination, which the university settled for $130,000.

=== Knoxville College presidency ===
In 1997, Hatton was recruited to become the president of Knoxville College in Tennessee, a position she held until 2005. The college was "struggling" and had lost its regional accreditation earlier that year due to financial problems.

The college had seen 10 presidents in the 17 years before her arrival. Hatton stated she accepted the position only after insisting that the board be "restarted," the board was subsequently "restocked" with only three members from the previous board remaining. At Knoxville, Hatton designed a "debt-free 'work college' model" allowing students to earn their education through structured internships.

In May 2005, twelve professors sued the college and Hatton, claiming they were owed approximately $330,000 in back pay since June 2004. The suit also alleged that the college had failed to maintain pension funds and that their health insurance had been cancelled. A separate lawsuit directed at Hatton alleged she had failed to give professors intended bonuses. That same month, another lawsuit was filed by more than 100 students claiming they were owed money for on-campus jobs from 2003. Despite the lack of pay, the professors in the lawsuit continued to teach.

Faculty and students sent letters to the board asking for Hatton's dismissal in the spring of 2005, though the board announced in May it was standing by her. On August 8, 2005, the board of trustees fired Hatton, effective immediately. The board alleged she had managed the school "by creating fear and intimidation" and listed nine grounds for her termination. Four trustees who had not attended the meeting resigned in protest. Following her dismissal, Robert H. Harvey, a former dean and acting president, was chosen to lead an interim management committee.

== Personal life and death ==
Hatton was a member of the Alpha Kappa Alpha sorority. She died in Boston, Massachusetts, on November 3, 2025, at the age of 84.
