= Horace A. Judson =

Ninth president of the state university of New York and academic administrator

Horace A. Judson is an American educator and academic administrator who served as the ninth president of the State University of New York at Plattsburgh from 1994 to 2003. His time at Plattsburgh was marred by controversy. Judson resigned from Plattsburgh State following criticisms from students and faculty that he was ignoring their input, isolating himself from the college and community and making poor choices in hirings and firings. His resignation was announced after the Student Association and United University Professions Chapter approved votes of no confidence in Judson's leadership.

He also served as president of Grambling State University in Louisiana from 2004 to 2009 and of the Knoxville College from 2010 to 2013. He was a graduate of Lincoln University, a historically black college in Pennsylvania and earned his Ph.D. in physical organic chemistry from Cornell University in Ithaca, New York. Prior to his presidency at SUNY Plattsburgh, he worked as vice president for academic affairs at Morgan State University and provost and vice president for Academic Affairs at the California State University, Stanislaus.
