= City of Knoxville Fire Department =

Knoxville Fire Department

Operational area
- Country: United States
- State: Tennessee
- City: Knoxville

Agency overview
- Established: 1854
- Annual calls: 29,161(2022)
- Employees: 327 (2022)
- Annual budget: $45,647,860 (2018)
- Staffing: Career
- Fire chief: Stan Sharp
- IAFF: 65

Facilities and equipment
- Battalions: 4
- Stations: 19
- Engines: 12
- Trucks: 4
- Tillers: 1
- Quints: 4
- Squads: 4
- Rescues: 2
- Ambulances: 1
- Tenders: 5
- HAZMAT: 1
- Wildland: 1
- Fireboats: 1

Website
- Official website

The Knoxville Fire Department is an ISO Class 2 department that provides fire protection and emergency medical services for the city of Knoxville, Tennessee. The department is responsible for 104 square miles (270 km^{2}) with over 190,000 residents.

== History ==
The Knoxville Fire Department can trace its beginnings to 1854 when Town Marshal J.D. Stacks saw the need for an organized volunteer fire department. But it was in March 1885 when the city of Knoxville formed a full-time, paid fire department. By the turn of the century, the number of firefighters in the department had grown to 30. With the increase in personnel came the need for more fire stations and better equipment. In the last 100 years, the Knoxville Fire Department has grown from the Headquarters station in an old livery stable building with two horse drawn engine companies and one aerial truck company to 19 fire stations, out of which 13 fire engines, 3 squads, 3 quints, 5 ladder trucks, 1 being a tiller or tractor drawn aerial, 2 rescue units, and 1 hazmat company operate, along with 5 tankers, 1 fire rescue boat, 1 ambulance, and other specialty equipment. These companies and units are under the command of 4 Battalions, each commanded by a Battalion Chief. The International Association of Firefighters (IAFF) Local is 65.

=== Historic Station ===
The departments Fire Station Number 5 is the oldest active fire station in Knoxville and is on the National Register of Historic Places. Opened on May 23, 1909, it has served the Mechanicsville community of Knoxville almost continuously since. The fire station was the last in Knoxville to be built specifically for horse-drawn fire apparatus. Located at 419 Arthur Street in Mechanicsville, just northwest of the downtown area the station was added on the National Register of Historic Places in 1978.

== Stations and apparatus ==
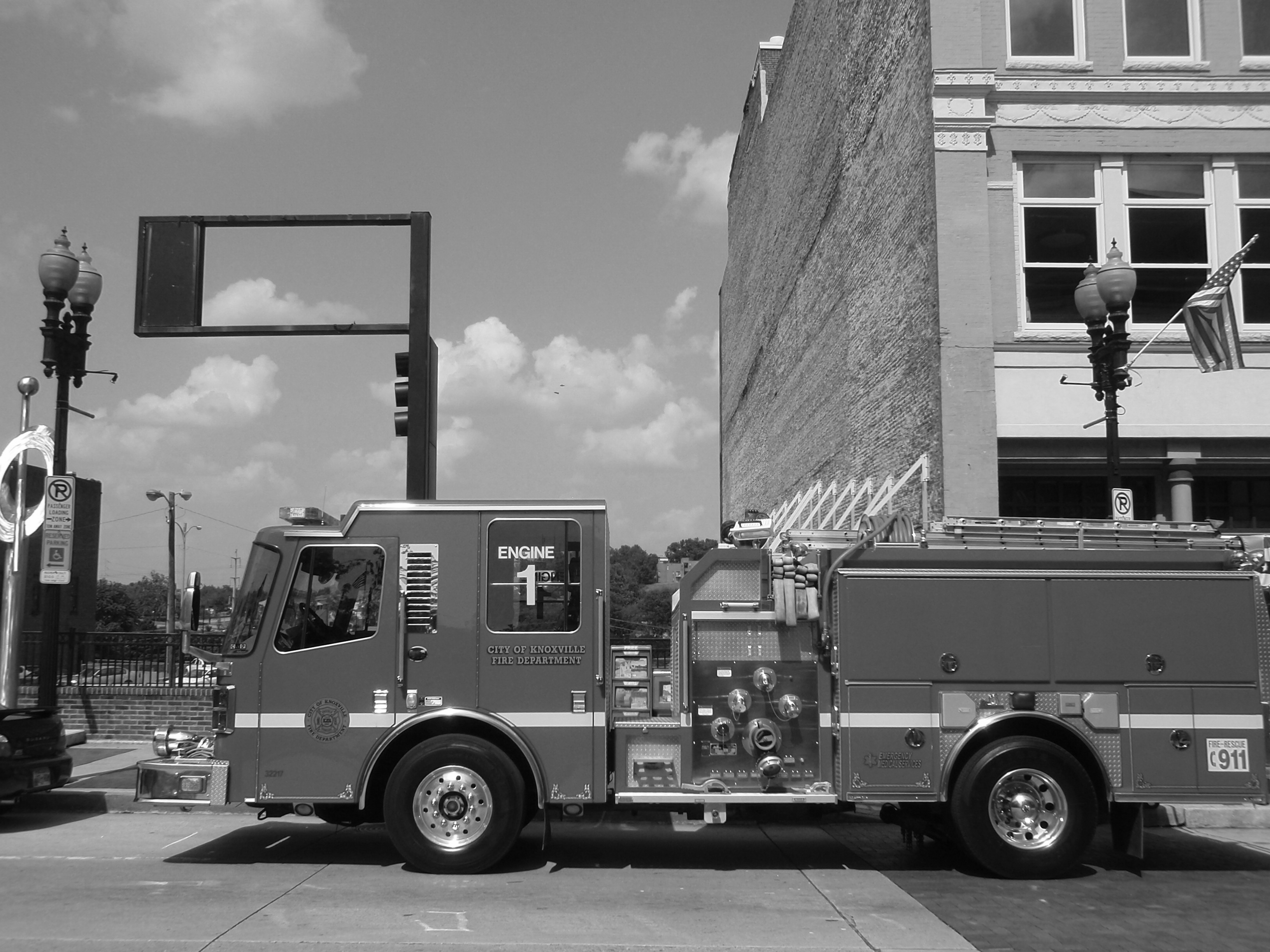
KFD's Engine 1 in July 2010.

Fire Station Number	Neighborhood	Engine Company/Squad Company	Ladder Company/Quint Company	Specialized Unit	Battalion Chief Unit	Battalion
1	Downtown	Engine 1 Engine 2	Ladder 1	Rescue 1, Brush Truck; Tanker 1, Fire Boat 1	Battalion Chief 1	1
3	Baxter Ave	Engine 3	Ladder 3			2
4	Park City/Park Ridge		Quint 4			2
5	Mechanicsville	Engine 5				4
6	Burlington	Engine 6				2
7	Lonsdale	Engine 7				4
9	Fort Sanders	Engine 9	Ladder 9			1
10	Sevier Avenue		Quint 10			1
11	Whittle Springs	Engine 11			Battalion Chief 2	2
12	Lonas	Engine 12				3
13	South Knoxville	Squad 13				1
14	Inskip-Norwood	Squad 14			Battalion Chief 4	4
15	Fountain City	Engine 15	Ladder 15			4
16	Chilhowee-Holston Hills	Squad 16		Tanker 16		2
17	Northwest		Quint 17	Tanker 17		4
18	Bearden	Engine 18	Ladder 18		Battalion Chief 3	3
19	Colonial Village	Engine 19				1
20	West Hills	Squad 20		Hazmat 1		3
21	John J. Duncan, Sr.		Quint 21	Tanker 21		3

== Ranks of KFD ==
Rank titles	Chief of Department	Deputy Chief	Assistant Chief / Battalion Chief	Captain	Master Firefighter	Senior Firefighter	Firefighter	Firefighter Recruit
Collar insignia								
Dress sleeve insignia								
Helmet Color	White	White	White	Red	Black	Black	Black	Black

== Notable Incidents ==
=== Million Dollar Fire ===
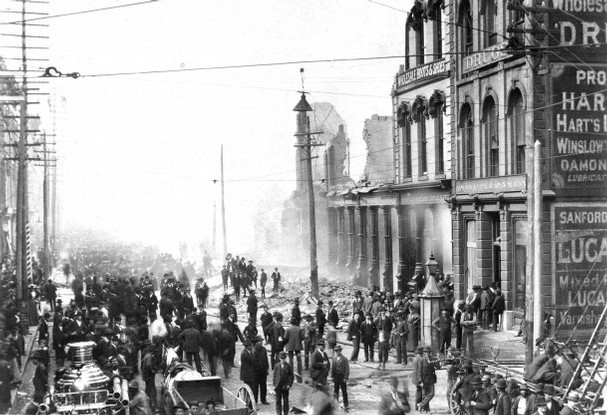
The aftermath of the Great Fire on Gay Street, April 1897.

Early on the morning of April 8, 1897, a fire engulfed two blocks of Gay Street from Commerce Avenue to Union Avenue in downtown Knoxville. The massive blaze required all the resources of KFD (listed at the time as two steam engines), as well as firefighters and equipment from as far away as Chattanooga to extinguish.

By the end of the blaze, five people had perished and losses were estimated at more than a million dollars (approximately $38,700,000 adjusted for inflation). The fire department resorted to using dynamite to stop the spread of the fire to other nearby buildings.

=== McClung Warehouse Fires ===
On February 7, 2007, the former McClung Warehouses in the 500 block of Jackson Avenue burned. Heavy damage was sustained to several buildings in the area. During the three alarm fire, several building collapses occurred, one of which heavily damaged Ladder 3. Additionally, four firefighters were injured when they were trapped upstairs in the burning building and had to make a hasty escape through a window using a fire hose as a makeshift rope ladder. The warehouses, some of which dated back to 1893, were mostly vacant at the time of the fire.

Another portion of the McClung Warehouse building was destroyed by fire in the early morning hours of February 1, 2014. This occurred less than a year after the City of Knoxville purchased the remaining warehouses with plans of encouraging developers to utilize them in urban renewal projects. Shortly after the two alarm blaze, city officials demolished another portion of the derelict structure.
