= Henry Morgan Green =

African-American physician (1877–1939)

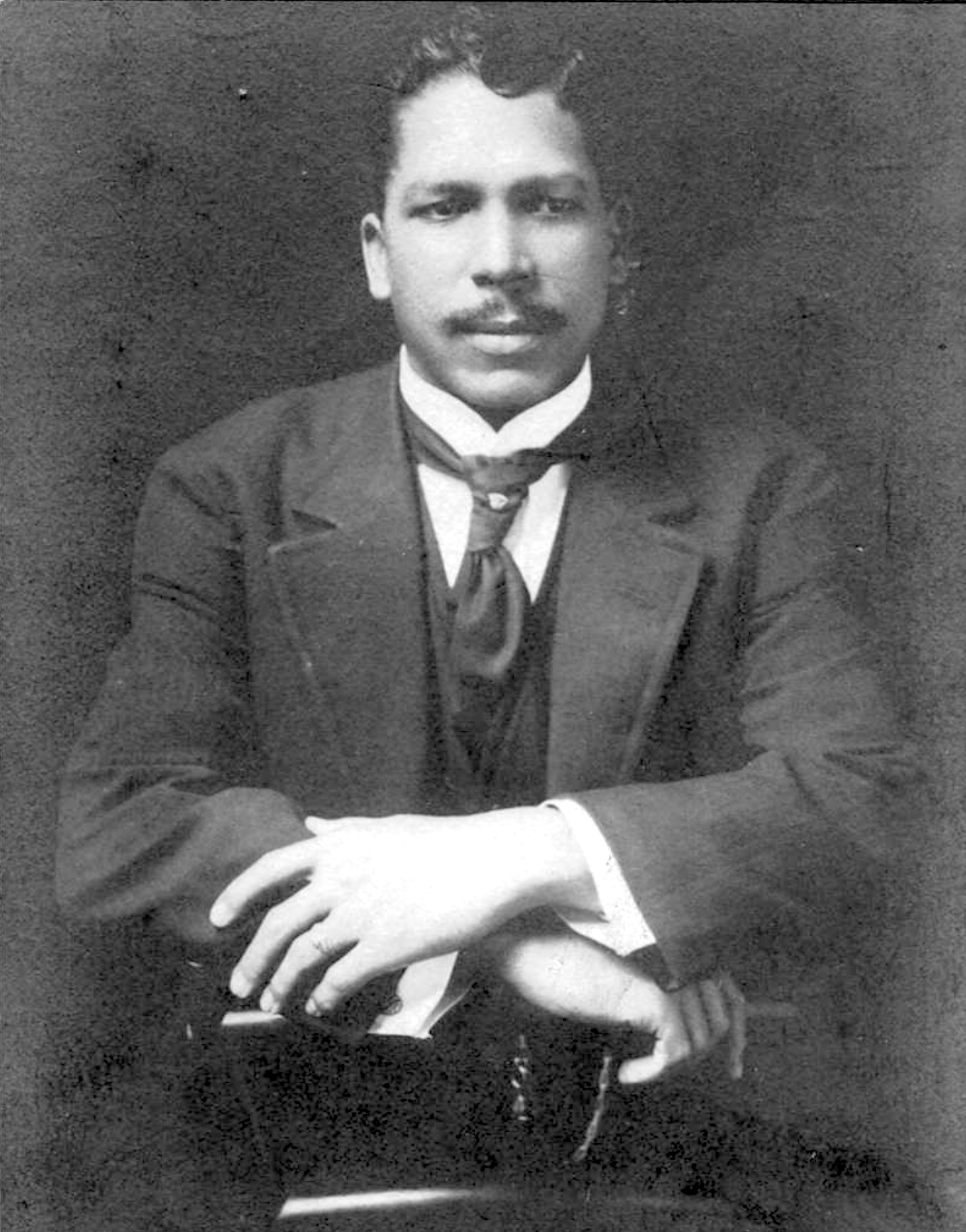
- Green in 1910
- Born: 1877; Adairsville, Georgia, U.S.
- Died: March 19, 1939 (aged 61–62); Knoxville, Tennessee, U.S.
- Other name: H. M. Green
- Education: Knoxville College, University of Michigan, Northwestern University
- Occupations: Physician; national healthcare leader; scholar; real estate investor; alderman
- Spouse: Henri Henderson
- Children: 2

Henry Morgan Green (1877–1939) was an American physician, a national healthcare leader, researcher, scholar, real estate investor, and alderman. He served as the city physician in Knoxville, Tennessee, and president of the National Medical Association. He was one of the founders of Knoxville Medical College; and is credited with expanding healthcare coverage for the Black community in Knoxville.

== Early life and education ==
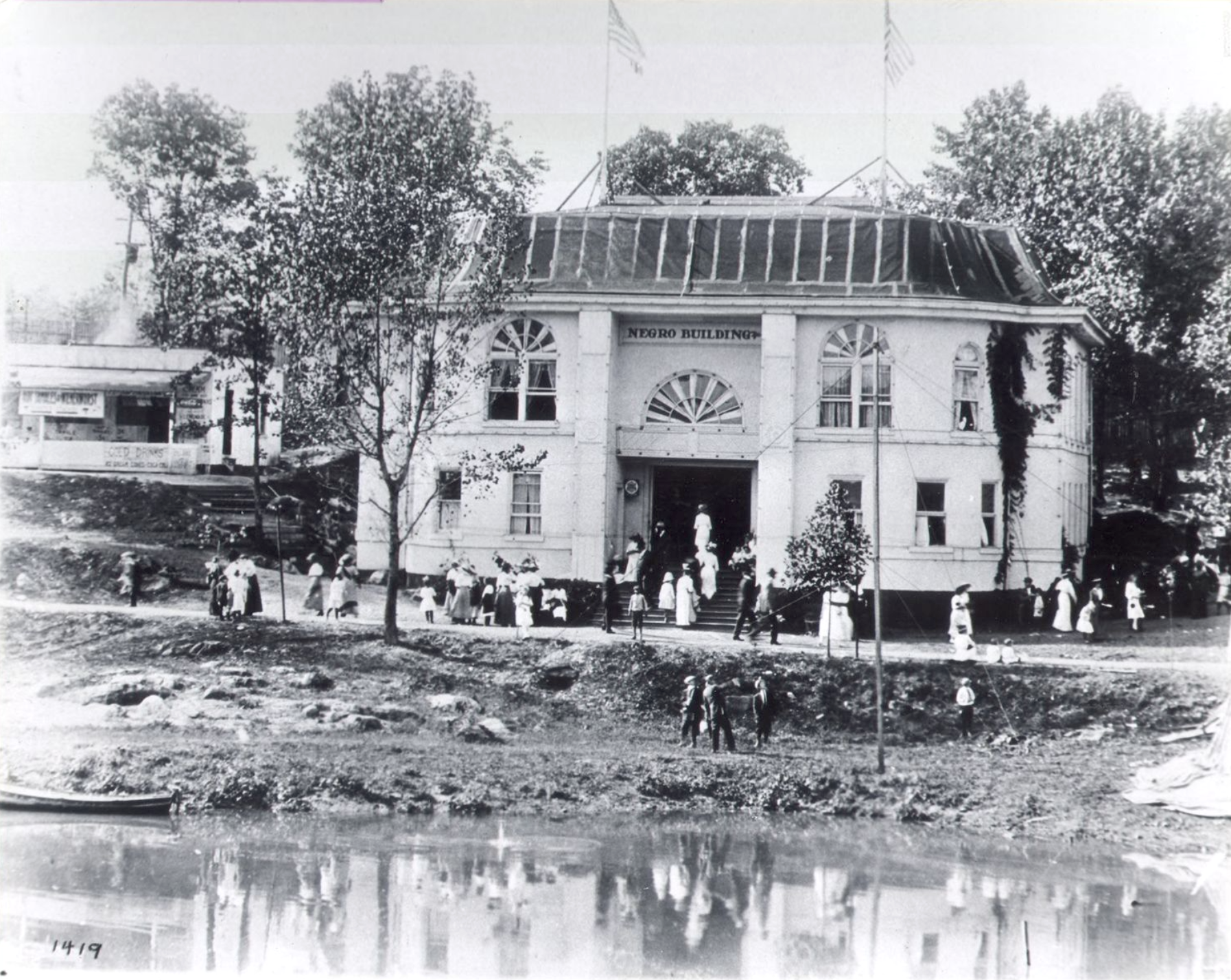
Appalachian Exposition's Negro Building (1910); Green served as the chairman of the "Colored Department" during the event

Henry Morgan Green was born in 1877 in Adairsville, Georgia. Green studied at the Normal School at Knoxville College, where he graduated (1895).

After a year of teaching in Riceville, Tennessee, he returned a year later to Knoxville College to attend the college's newly established medical department. Green continued studies at the University of Michigan, and Northwestern University.

== Career ==
He had an early medical practice in Jellico, Tennessee. For 17 years he served as the city physician in Knoxville, Tennessee; and worked as a doctor in Knoxville from 1900 to 1939. Green was one of the founders of Knoxville Medical College (1900–1910).

In 1900, Green became an alderman (or council member) in order to represent his neighborhood in the fifth ward, he was the first Black alderman in the city. He remained an alderman until 1912, and it took another 62 years before the Knoxville city council had another Black alderman. In 1910 and 1911, Green served as the chairman of the "Colored Department" at the Appalachian Exposition, held in Knoxville.

He served as president of the National Medical Association, elected in 1922; and was the founding president of the National Hospital Association in 1923.

In 1922, Green married school teacher Henri Henderson; and together they had two children.

== Death and legacy ==
He died of pneumonia on March 19, 1939, in Knoxville. He is buried on the campus of Knoxville College, in the Freedmen's Mission Historic Cemetery (formerly known as the Fourth United Presbyterian Church Cemetery).

The Green School (sometimes refer to as the "Colored High School" in the early years) in Knoxville was named for him, and opened in 1909. Green was profiled in the book, The Knoxville Negro: Emphasizing the Great Era of Progress Prevalent in Negro Knoxville Today (1929) by Bartow G. Wilson.

== See also ==
- Edith Irby Jones
