= Mechanicsville, Knoxville =

- Mechanicsville Historic District
- U.S. National Register of Historic Places
- U.S. Historic district
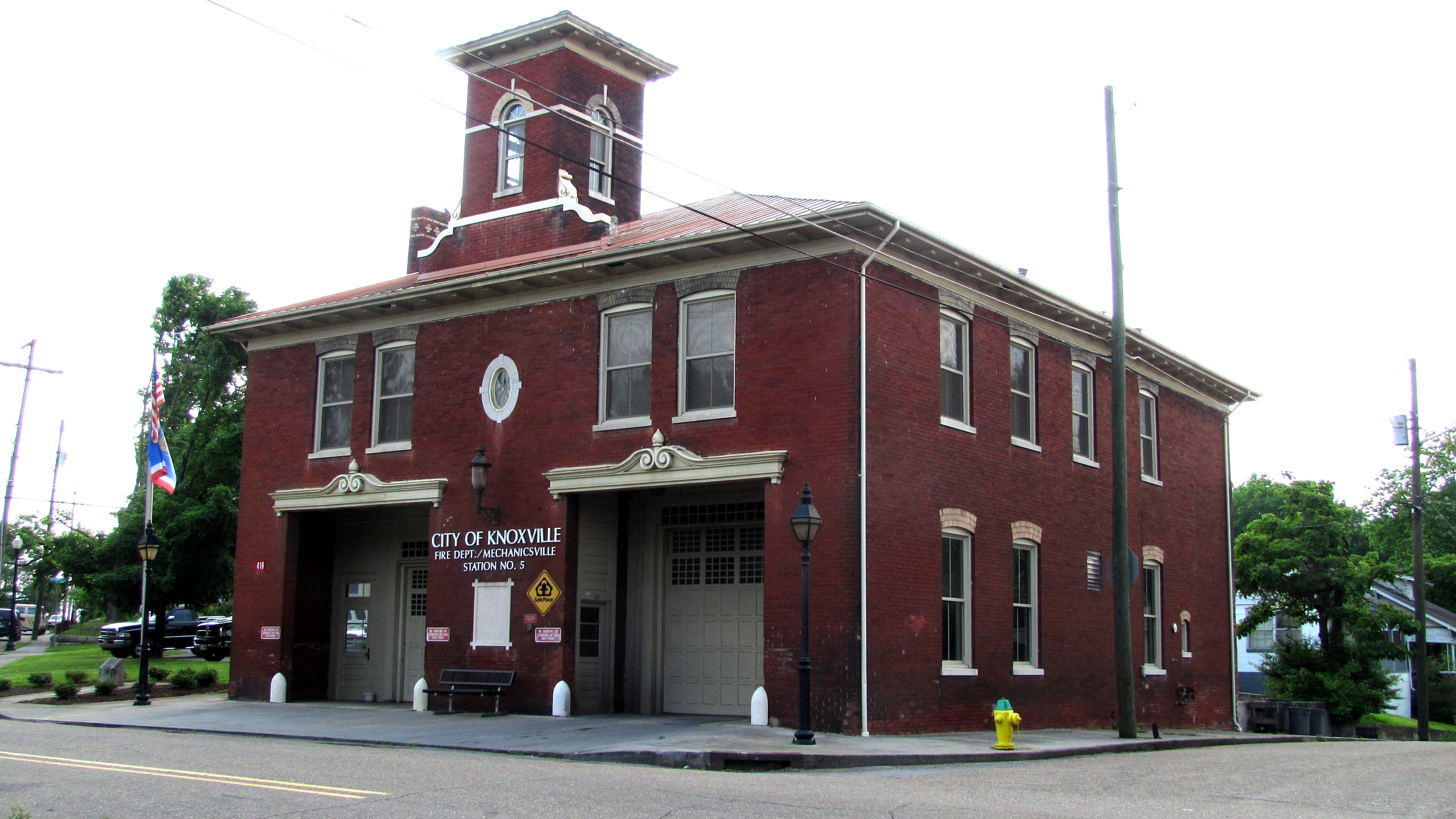
- Fire Station No. 5 in Mechanicsville

- Location within Tennessee Location within the United States
- Location: Includes portions of University, Middle, Boyd, Arthur, McGhee, Clark, Oak, Deaderick, Tulip, Hannah, Western, and College; Knoxville, Tennessee
- Coordinates: 35°58′07″N 83°56′02″W
- Area: approximately 31 acres (13 ha)
- Built: 1880–1920
- Architect: multiple
- Architectural style: Queen Anne, Italianate, Victorian commercial, Gothic Revival, Shotgun
- NRHP reference No.: 80003842
- Added to NRHP: July 18, 1980

Mechanicsville is a neighborhood in Knoxville, Tennessee, United States, located northwest of the city's downtown area. One of the city's oldest neighborhoods, Mechanicsville was established in the late 1860s for skilled laborers working in the many factories that sprang up along Knoxville's periphery. The neighborhood still contains a significant number of late-19th-century Victorian homes, and a notable concentration of early-20th-century shotgun houses. In 1980, several dozen properties in Mechanicsville were added to the National Register of Historic Places as the Mechanicsville Historic District. The neighborhood was also designated as a local historic district in 1991, subject to historic zoning and design standards.

Post-Civil War railroad construction lured heavy industry to the Second Creek valley, starting with the Knoxville Iron Company, which built a massive foundry just southeast of Mechanicsville in 1868. In the 19th century, when the neighborhood acquired its name, the word "mechanic" typically referred to factory workers. Mechanicsville was developed during this period to provide housing for Welsh iron specialists and African-American laborers working at Knoxville Iron and other area factories. By the 1880s, Mechanicsville was surrounded by large factories and mills, and contained most of Knoxville's railroad maintenance shops.

In the early twentieth century, Mechanicsville developed into a primarily African-American neighborhood, and was home to the historically black Knoxville College and Knoxville Medical College, and several early black entrepreneurs and professors.

== Location ==
Mechanicsville is roughly bounded by Interstate 40 on the south, Interstate 275 on the east, Beaumont Avenue on the north, and Western Avenue (part of State Highway 62) on the west. Knoxville's downtown area, namely the Old City and the Southern Railway tracks, lie opposite I-40 to the southeast. The North Knoxville area lies east of I-275, and the Lonsdale area lies to the north. The Fort Sanders neighborhood lies on the other side of I-40 to the south and the University of Tennessee just blocks away.

University Avenue divides Mechanicsville into "Old Mechanicsville," which consists of the neighborhood's older, southeastern section, and "New Mechanicsville," which consists of the more recently developed northern section. The 39-acre (16 ha) campus of Knoxville College dominates the western portion of Mechanicsville.

Second Creek, which attracted numerous factories and mills to the area in the late nineteenth century, passes just west of Mechanicsville. Railroad tracks (now used by the Southern Railway), which also attracted industry to the area, pass just south and east of Mechanicsville, running roughly parallel to I-40 and I-275.

== History ==
=== Civil War ===
During the Siege of Knoxville, in which Confederate forces under James Longstreet surrounded Knoxville in hopes of starving out Union forces occupying the city, Confederate lines criss-crossed the Mechanicsville area. Confederate pickets stretched between what is now Arthur Street and Clark Street from Western Avenue to Fifth Avenue, as well as along Iredell and Pickett. Several Confederate batteries, which provided part of the artillery barrage during the Battle of Fort Sanders, were situated in the hills where Knoxville College is now located.

In 2006, amateur Civil War historian Gary Goodson announced that he had determined that the Confederate Camp Van Dorn was located in Malcolm Martin Park, just west of Knoxville College, but his hypothesis was received with some skepticism.

=== Post-Civil War development ===
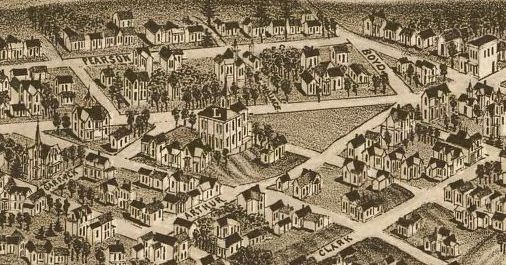
Mechanicsville, as it appeared on an 1886 map of Knoxville

The combination of railroad construction and Northern financing led to a post-war economic boom in Knoxville, and it was during this period that dozens of factories were built along Second Creek. In 1867, 104 Welsh immigrant families were brought to the area from Pennsylvania by the Welsh-born Richards brothers, Joseph and David, to work in a local rolling mill. The Richards brothers secured a tract of land in what is now Mechanicsville from railroad tycoon Charles McClung McGhee (1828–1907), which was subsequently laid out in lots, and the new settlers began building houses. This new neighborhood, known as "McGhee's Addition," was the first successful Welsh colony in Tennessee.

In 1868, Civil War general-turned-entrepreneur Hiram S. Chamberlain and the Richards brothers established the Knoxville Iron Company, which erected a massive foundry and nail factory across Second Creek from McGhee's Addition (part of this complex, now known simply as "The Foundry," still stands). Chamberlain provided the business expertise, while the Richards brothers provided the technical expertise. Several houses in Mechanicsville still have fences made from iron cast at the Knoxville Iron foundry in the 1870s and 1880s.

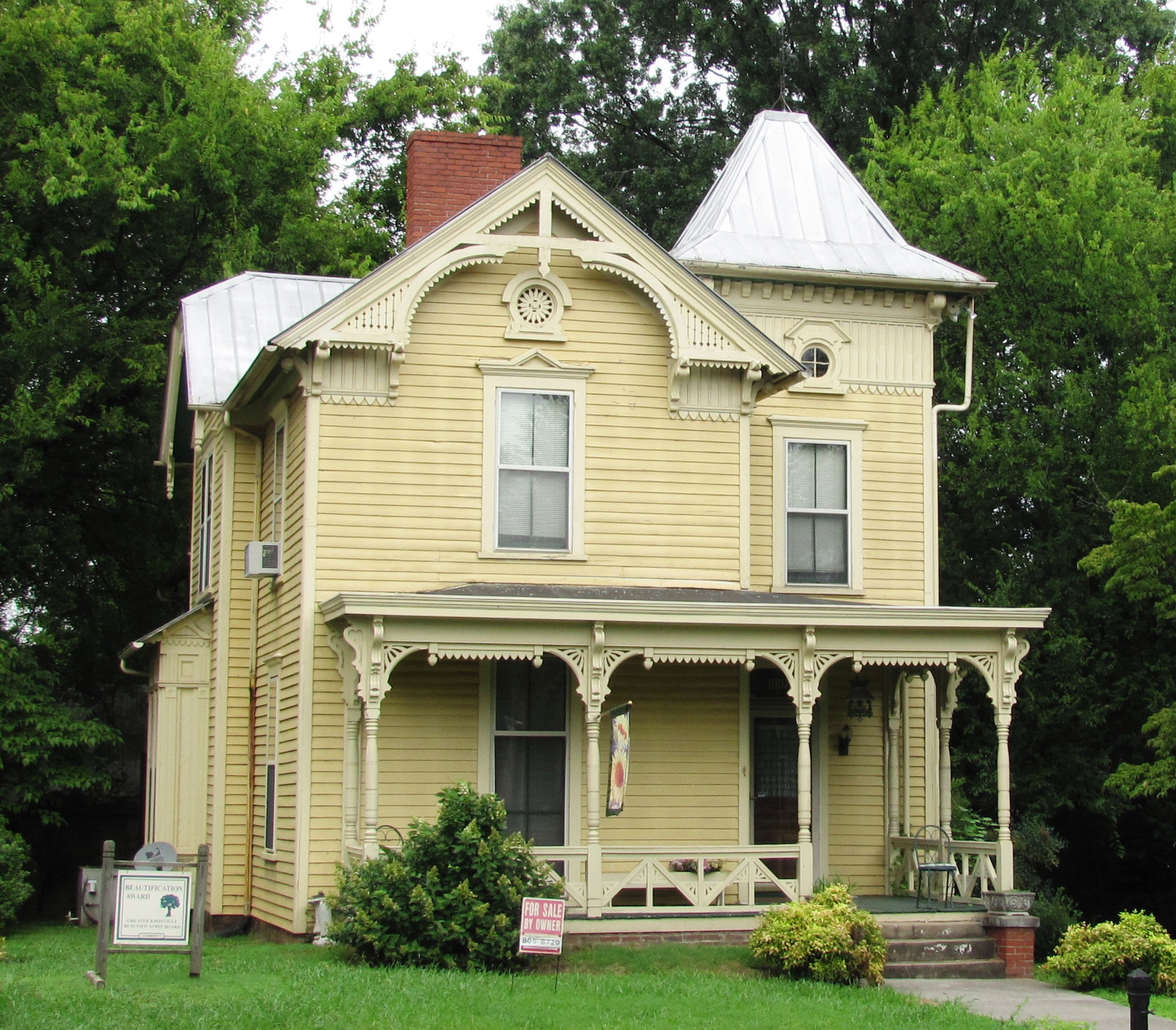
Queen Anne-style house at 1007 Oak Avenue, built circa 1890.

As more factory specialists and laborers moved into the area, Mechanicsville began to grow. The Welsh community expanded to include an area known as the Deaderick–Swann Addition, which included much of modern Deaderick and Arthur streets, and adjacent streets. Residents in this section built many of Mechanicsville's elaborate Victorian homes in the 1880s and 1890s. African-American factory workers settled primarily in the Middleton–Weatherford Addition, which was concentrated around what is now Calloway and Boyd streets. McAnally's Addition, commonly called McAnally Flats, consisted of the area south of Western Avenue, in the vicinity of Leslie Street Park. This latter section developed a reputation as a rough slum in later years, and provided the setting for part of the Cormac McCarthy novel, Suttree.

Mechanicsville residents voted to be annexed by Knoxville in 1882. Knoxville was initially lukewarm to the idea, but agreed to accept Mechanicsville as its Ninth Ward on January 1, 1883. At the time of its annexation, Mechanicsville reported a population of just over 2,000, three churches, two schools, six general stores, and a greenhouse. Along with Knoxville Iron, factories located in and around Mechanicsville during this period included the Knoxville Brewing Company (on McGhee), the Standard Handle Company, the W. H. Evans and Son marble company, the Knoxville Car and Wheel Company, and the Greenleaf Turntable Manufactory.

=== 20th century ===
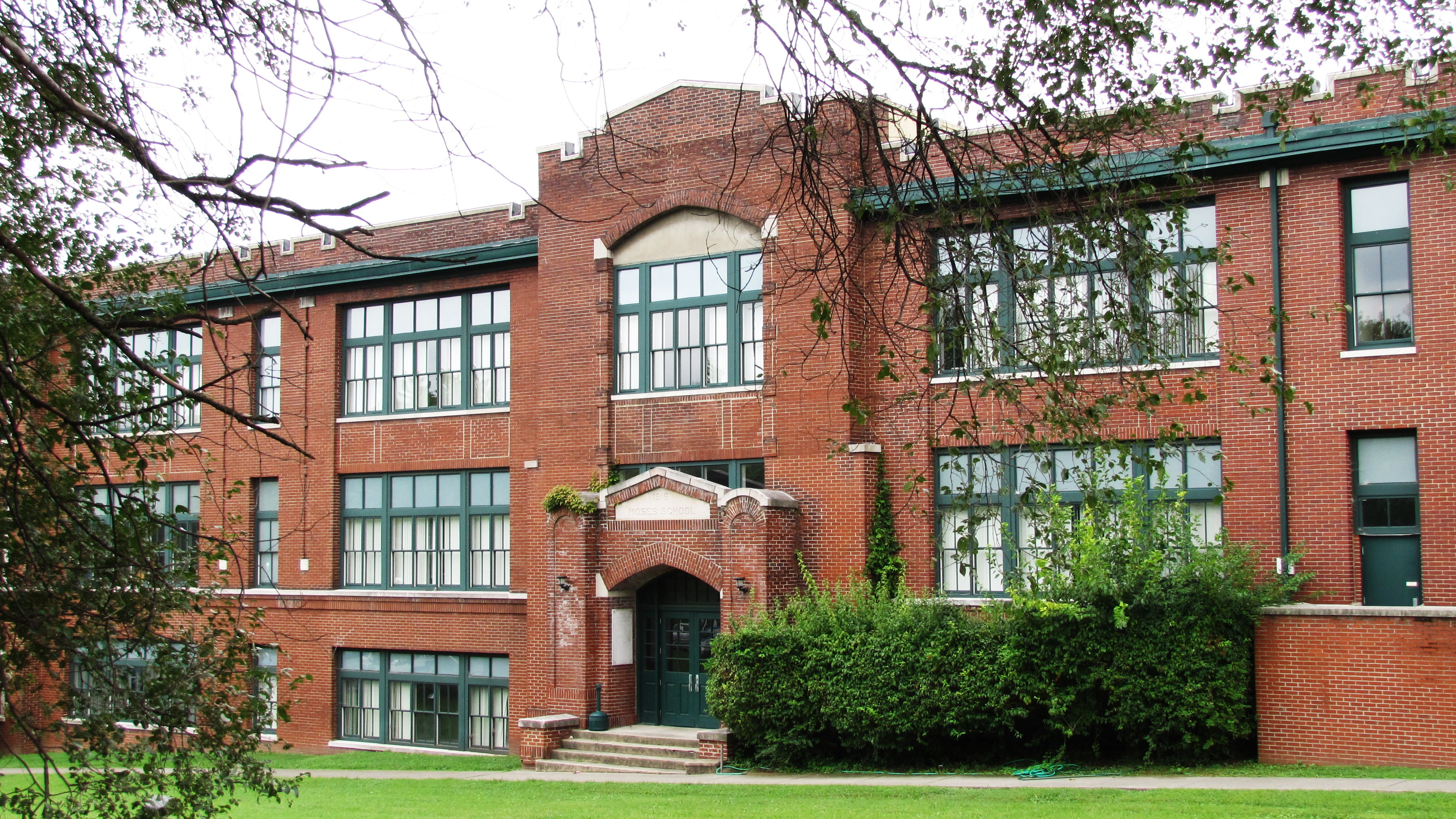
Moses School building

As the Welsh immigrant families became more successful, they established other businesses in Knoxville, and in subsequent decades, many Welsh dispersed into other sections of the city. Today, more than 250 families in greater Knoxville can trace their ancestry to these original immigrants. The Welsh tradition in Knoxville is remembered through the Welsh descendants' celebration of Saint David's Day.

In the early 20th century, Mechanicsville evolved into a prosperous neighborhood of African American businesses and working families, and remained so for several decades. One of the first African-American institutions in Mechanicsville was the Fairview School, built on land donated by John Moses in 1875. The school was later renamed the Moses School, with the present building completed in 1930. Knoxville College, established in 1875 by the United Presbyterian Church, remained the city's primary black institution throughout the first half of the 20th century. Cansler Street in Mechanicsville is named for Charles W. Cansler (1871–1953), a leading black citizen and advocate for African-American rights in the early 1900s.

Mechanicsville experienced a decline during the second half of the 20th century as Knoxville's middle class moved from urban areas to suburbs on the city's periphery. A number of old homes were demolished to make way for the construction of the expressway that would eventually become I-40, and others deteriorated as they were converted into low-rent apartments. College Homes, a public housing development, was built as an urban renewal project near the commercial center of the neighborhood, northwest of Knoxville College. High crime rates continued to drive residents away, however, leaving many homes vacant.

== Mechanicsville today ==
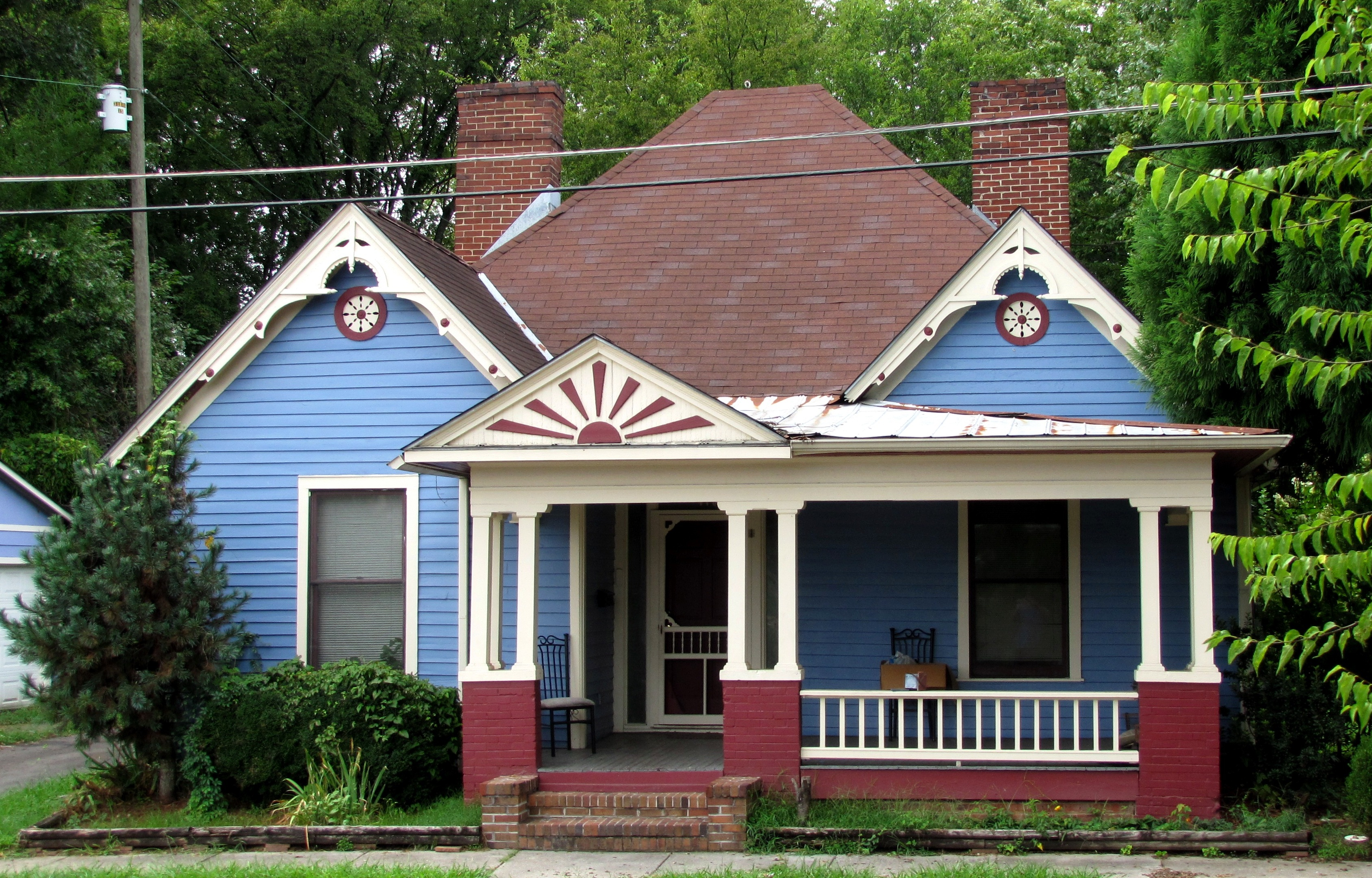
Rehabilitated Queen Anne-style cottage at 415 Clark Street

Major community revitalization efforts in Mechanicsville began in the 1970s with the establishment of the preservation group Mechanicsville Citizens for a Better Community. In 1985, Knoxville created the Mechanicsville Task Force, which made recommendations on the rehabilitation of historic homes and the construction of new homes. During the same period, a study on the blighting conditions in the neighborhood was conducted, culminating in the report, "A Redevelopment Plan for Historic Mechanicsville, Knoxville, Tennessee."

In 1997, the local public housing authority, Knoxville's Community Development Corporation (KCDC), received a $22 million HOPE VI grant from the Department of Housing and Urban Development to revitalize the College Homes portion of the neighborhood. The families living in the College Homes barracks-style apartments were relocated and the housing project was demolished. The area was then rebuilt with single family and duplex homes designed to blend architecturally with remaining late 19th century neighborhood. In addition, KCDC purchased over 100 vacant lots throughout the neighborhood for new construction, which was also designed to fit in architecturally with the remaining neighborhood. Efforts were made to enable low income families from the area to rent or purchase these homes.

A number of corporations have recently located offices and businesses in the area, including the Knoxville News-Sentinel, Cherokee Health Systems, Pilot Oil, Fort Sanders Health System, and a Food City grocery store.

== Mechanicsville Historic District ==
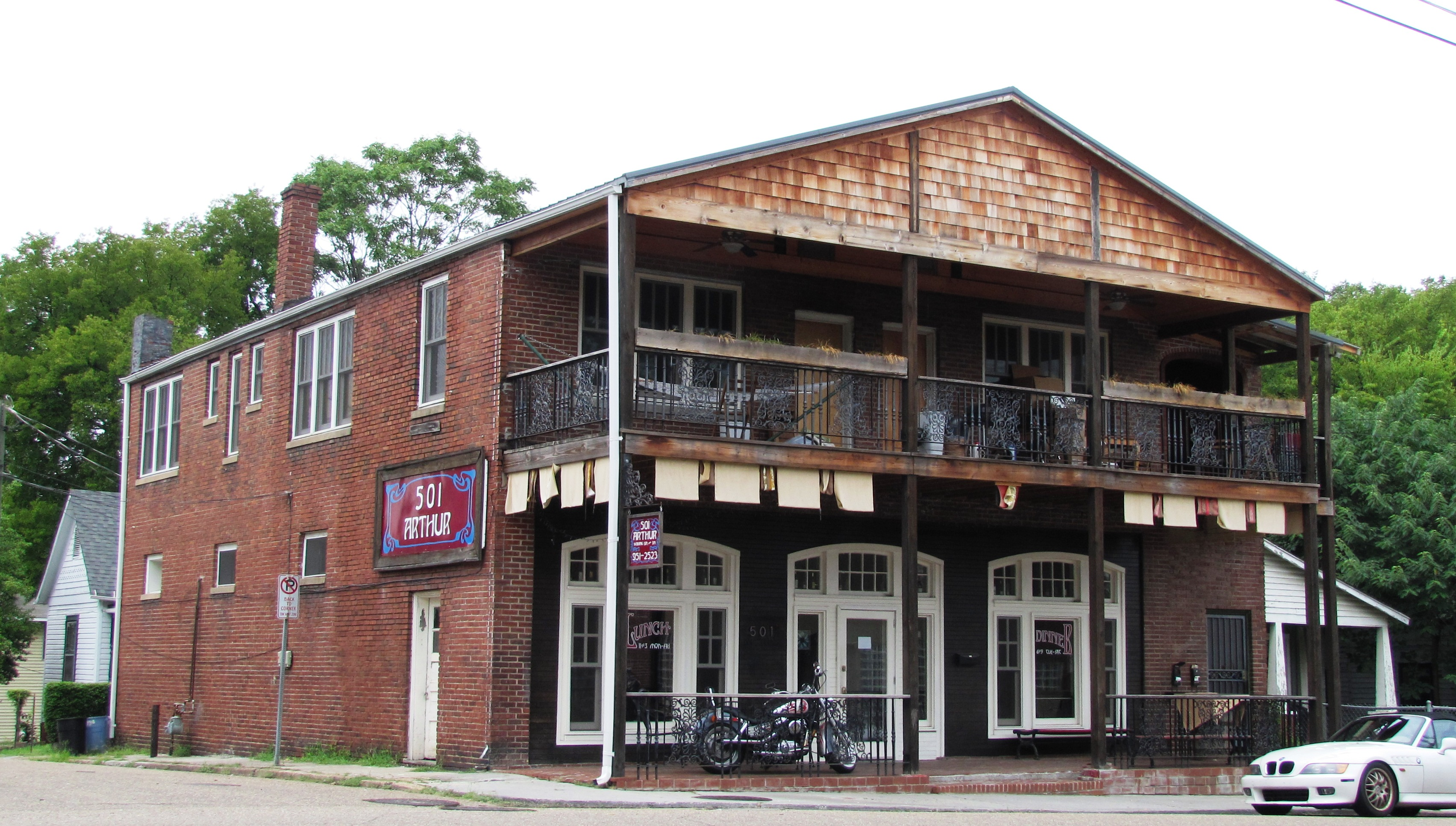
501 Arthur, formerly Bradley's Food Market, now a Buddhist temple

Mechanicsville's National Register historic district comprises one of the oldest extant neighborhoods from Knoxville's post-Civil War expansion. Some of its Victorian houses exhibit distinctively Italianate and Gothic influences uncommon in nearby neighborhoods such as Fourth and Gill and Old North Knoxville. The section of Old Mechanicsville along Calloway and Boyd contains Knoxville's largest concentration of early twentieth century shotgun houses.

=== Notable buildings ===
- Fire Station No. 5 (419 Arthur Street), a two-story Neoclassical-style firehall built in 1909. This building is Knoxville's oldest firehall, and was listed individually on the National Register in 1979.
- Moses School (221 Arthur Street), a three-story brick school building constructed in 1930. A school has existed at this site since the establishment of the Fairview school in 1875. The school was known as the Ninth Ward School in the 1880s, but was eventually renamed for John L. Moses, who had donated the property for the school. The current school building now houses Knoxville's only charter School, Emerald Academy. Prior to the charter school the building housed a branch of the Knoxville Police Department Training Academy, and a local chapter of the Boys and Girls Club.
- 501 Arthur (501 Arthur Street), a two-story brick commercial structure with a two-tier porch, built circa 1910. This building was for many years home to a grocery store known as Bradley Food Market, and was most recently home to a Buddhist temple.

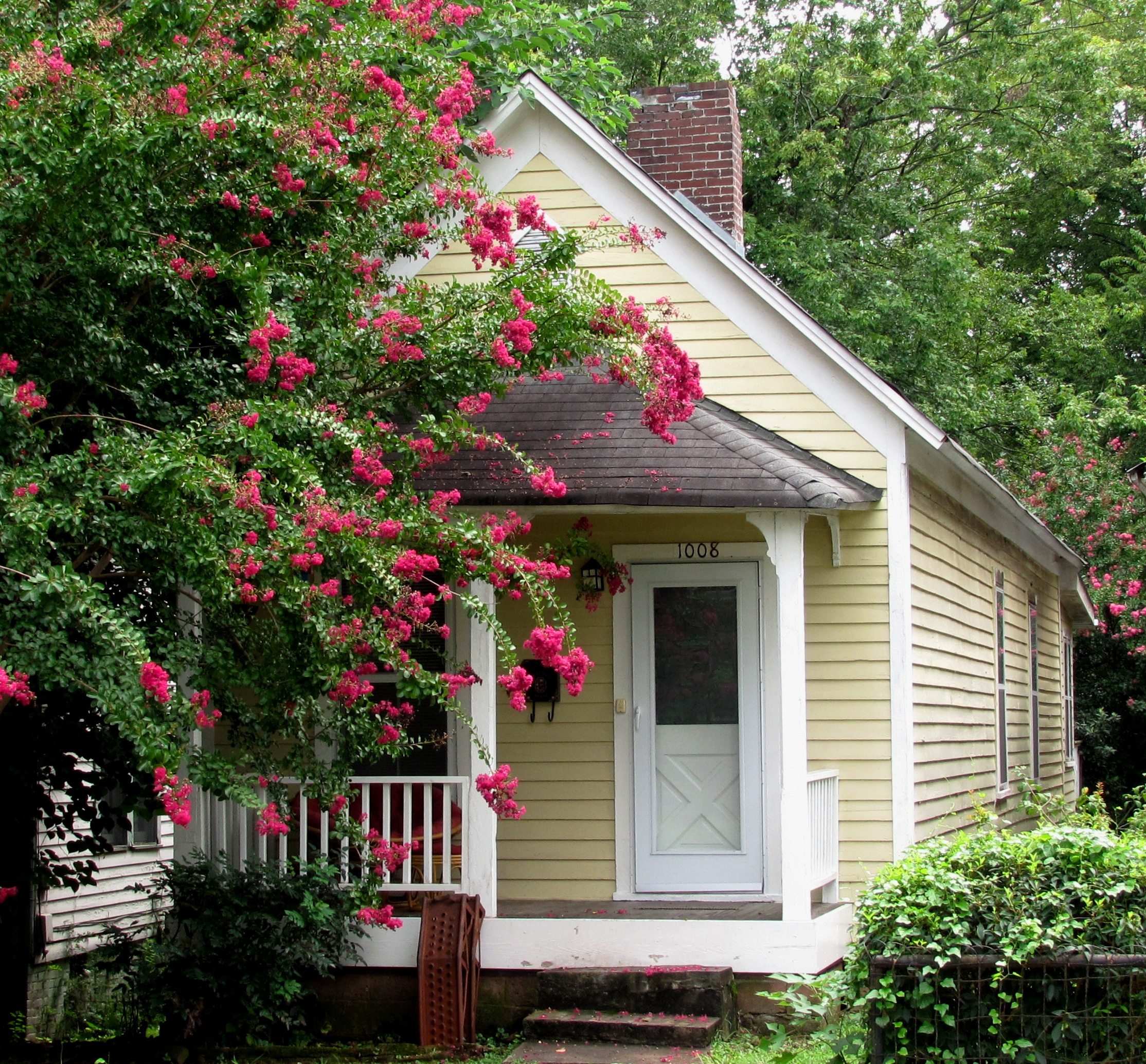
Shotgun house at 1008 McGhee Avenue, built in 1910

- 1601 Western Avenue, a two-story wedge-shaped building with brick band, built circa 1900; originally a restaurant and also housing a barbershop from the 1920's into the mid-1980's.
- 1545 Western Avenue, a two-story brick Victorian-style commercial structure built circa 1900; formerly home to Western Heights Hardware.
- 244 Deaderick Avenue, a two-story brick commercial structure built circa 1900; wedge-shaped to fit the intersection of Deaderick and Carrick.
- 224 Deaderick Avenue, a two-story house with Gothic Revival elements and a bay window with a sunburst motif, built circa 1900.
- 243 Deaderick Avenue, a two-story Queen Anne-style house with Eastlake-style porch, built circa 1890.
- 415 Clark Street, a one-story Queen Anne-style cottage built in 1910.
- 1007 Oak Avenue, a two-story Queen Anne-style house with an Eastlake-style front porch and a decorated iron fence, built circa 1890.
- 1008 McGhee Avenue, a one-story shotgun house built in 1910.
- 1012 McGhee Avenue, a one-story shotgun house built circa 1900.
- 1509 Boyd Street, a one-story shotgun house built circa 1910.
