= WOKI =

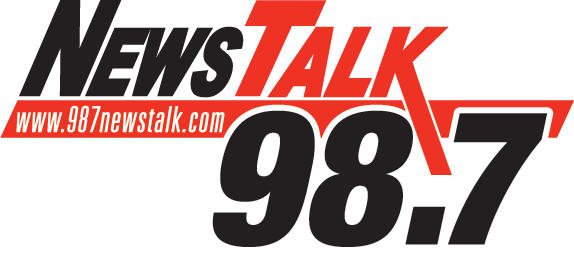
- Oliver Springs, Tennessee; United States
- Broadcast area: Knoxville Metropolitan Area
- Frequency: 98.7 MHz
- Branding: News/Talk 98.7 FM

Programming
- Format: News/talk
- Network: Fox News Radio
- Affiliations: Westwood One; Premiere Networks; Tennessee Titans Radio Network

Ownership
- Owner: Cumulus Media; (Radio License Holding CBC, LLC)
- Sister stations: WIVK-FM, WNML, WNML-FM

History
- First air date: September 15, 1989
- Former call signs: WXVO (1989–1999); WSMJ (1999–2002); WYIL-FM (2002–2005)
- Call sign meaning: Oak Ridge, city of license for the original WOKI-FM

Technical information
- Facility ID: 10457
- Class: C3
- ERP: 8,000 watts
- HAAT: 174 meters (571 ft)
- Transmitter coordinates: 36°06′48″N 84°03′44″W

Links
- Webcast: Listen live
- Website: newstalk987.com

WOKI (98.7 FM) is a commercial radio station licensed to Oliver Springs, Tennessee, United States, and serving the Knoxville metropolitan area. It is owned by Cumulus Media and it broadcasts a talk format. The studios and offices are on Old Kingston Pike in the Sequoyah Hills section of West Knoxville.

WOKI has an effective radiated power (ERP) of 8,000 watts. The transmitter is on Granville Lane in Heiskell, Tennessee, using a tower about twenty miles northwest of Knoxville.

== History ==
=== The 100.3 frequency ===
WOKI-FM, previously on the 100,000-watt 100.3 FM frequency in Oak Ridge, Tennessee, began in 1974 with a progressive rock format using automated announcements. By the late 1970s it had switched to successful Top-40 format mixed with some southern and hard rock, and live disc jockeys. WOKI-FM was started and owned by local Knoxville radio broadcaster Johnny Pirkle. During the late 1970s WOKI-FM also carried University of Tennessee Tennessee Volunteers football games and for two years sponsored the "Ramblin' Raft Race" on the Clinch River.

The station had several popular air personalities including Mike Beverly, "The Brothers", Shotgun Stevens, and Brother John St. John who held court each evening with the "Boogie Check" call-in program. WOKI was named from its city of license, Oak Ridge.

Meanwhile, WORI was a daytimer, broadcasting at 1550 kHz on the AM dial with an adult contemporary format. WORI eventually ceased broadcasting altogether, while WOKI-FM after its switch to the Top 40 format was in competition with WIMZ-FM (103.5 FM) for the Knoxville market's top rock station.

After the early 1980s, WOKI dropped the hard and southern rock and sports, and became strictly a mainstream Top 40 station thru 1993, broadcasting as "FM 100", "Hits 100", and "I-100".

=== Country and adult alternative ===
In 1993, the station became known as "The Hitkicker," broadcasting a country music format until 1997 when it briefly became “Outlaw Country 100.3.” That was followed by a classic hits format, known as “Eagle 100”. In 2001 WOKI-FM changed to an Adult Album Alternative (AAA) format as "100.3 The River", which was later "98.7 The River" when the WOKI call letters moved to 98.7. The 100.3 frequency then switched to a talk radio format when WNOX moved to WOKI's frequency on July 19, 2010.

On July 7, 2010, Oak Ridge FM announced plans for WNOX to stay with its talk format but with different hosts.

WOKI's tower, while on 100.3, was located on Cross Mountain. That tower had an elevation of 3,534 feet, located north of Briceville, Tennessee. Accordingly, its signal could be received throughout East Tennessee as well as parts of Kentucky, Virginia, South Carolina, North Carolina, West Virginia and Georgia.

=== The 98.7 frequency ===
The station at 98.7 MHz first signed on the air on September 15, 1989. Its call sign was WXVO, airing a country music format. It was owned by Charles E. Phillips.

It later switched to active rock as "98.7 The X". From 1999 to 2002 the station was WSMJ, with a smooth jazz format. As WYIL "Wild 98.7", the station was Rhythmic Contemporary. At that point, it moved from 100.3 to 98.7. Starting in 2007 the station was known as "98.7 Earl-FM" with an oldies format using The True Oldies Channel.

=== Switching 98.7 and 100.3 ===
On June 14, 2010, it was announced that on July 9, sister station WNOX would move its talk radio format to WOKI's 100.3 frequency while WOKI's music format would switch to 98.7 FM. Citadel merged with Cumulus Media on September 16, 2011. The 100.3 frequency has since switched to Country station WCYQ, owned by SummitMedia.

After filing for bankruptcy, Citadel Broadcasting ended its lease agreement with Oak Ridge FM, Inc. for the 100.3 WNOX frequency two years early. On July 19, 2010 WNOX moved its former programming to 98.7 WOKI, with 100.3 FM airing nothing but reminders that former WNOX listeners should turn to 98.7. The switch came 14 days earlier than they had originally announced. The True Oldies Channel programming has since moved to WMTY AM 670 and WMTY-FM 98.7 MHz.

== Programming ==
Local personalities on WOKI include Phil Williams, Bob Yarbrough and Hallerin Hilton Hill. The station is also an affiliate of the Tennessee Titans NFL radio network.
