= WVLZ =

WVLZ may refer to:

- WVLZ (AM), a radio station (850 AM) licensed to serve Maryville, Tennessee, United States
- WATO (FM), a radio station (106.1 FM) licensed to serve Oliver Springs, Tennessee, United States, which held the call sign WVLZ from 2020 to 2024
- WTLT, a radio station (1120 AM) licensed to serve Maryville, Tennessee, which held the call sign WVLZ from 2018 to 2020
- WKCE (AM), a radio station (1180 AM) licensed to serve Knoxville, Tennessee, which held the call sign WVLZ from 2002 to 2018
