= WKVL =

WKVL may refer to:

- WKVL (FM), a radio station (104.9 FM) licensed to serve Greenback, Tennessee, United States
- WSMM (AM), a radio station (850 AM) licensed to serve Maryville, Tennessee, which held the call sign WKVL from 1999 to 2023
- WFIV-FM, a radio station (105.3 FM) licensed to serve Loudon, Tennessee, which held the call sign WKVL-FM from 2000 to 2005
- WQZQ, a radio station (830 AM) licensed to serve Goodlettsville, Tennessee, which held the call sign WKVL from 1979 to 1988
