= WMTY (disambiguation) =

WMTY-FM is a radio station (98.3 FM) licensed to Sweetwater, Tennessee.

WMTY may also refer to:

- WMTY (AM), a defunct radio station (670 AM) formerly licensed to Farragut, Tennessee, United States
- WCZZ, a radio station (1090 AM) licensed to Greenwood, South Carolina, which held the call sign WMTY from 1973 to 2005
- WZSN, a radio station (103.5 FM) licensed to Greenwood, South Carolina, which held the call sign WMTY-FM from 1989 to 1999
