= WNML =

WNML may refer to:

- WNML (AM), a radio station (990 AM) licensed to serve Knoxville, Tennessee, United States
- WNML-FM, a radio station (99.1 FM) licensed to serve Friendsville, Tennessee
