= WCYQ =

Oak Ridge, Tennessee; United States
- Broadcast area: Knoxville metropolitan area–East Tennessee
- Frequency: 100.3 MHz (HD Radio)
- Branding: 100.3 The Wolf

Programming
- Format: Country music
- Affiliations: Premiere Networks

Ownership
- Owner: SummitMedia; (SM-WCYQ, LLC)
- Sister stations: WKHT, WNOX, WWST

History
- First air date: April 20, 1974
- Former call signs: WOKI-FM (1974–2005); WNOX (2005–2013)
- Call sign meaning: Country Q (previous branding)

Technical information
- Licensing authority: FCC
- Facility ID: 49923
- Class: C
- ERP: 96,000 watts
- HAAT: 618.2 meters (2,028 ft)
- Transmitter coordinates: 36°11′54.00″N 84°13′52.00″W

Links
- Public license information: Public file; LMS
- Webcast: Listen Live; Listen Live via iHeart
- Website: knoxvillewolf.com

WCYQ (100.3 FM) is a commercial radio station licensed to Oak Ridge, Tennessee, and serving the Knoxville metropolitan area and East Tennessee. The station is owned by SummitMedia and broadcasts a country music radio format, calling itself 100.3 The Wolf, its studios and offices are on Amherst Road in Knoxville.

WCYQ has an effective radiated power (ERP) of 96,000 watts, its transmitter is north of Briceville, Tennessee. Its tower is at 618.2 meters (2,028 feet) in height above average terrain (HAAT). That elevation means its signal can be received around East Tennessee as well as parts of Kentucky, Virginia, North Carolina and Georgia.

== History ==
=== WOKI-FM ===
The station signed on the air on April 20, 1974, its original call sign was WOKI-FM.

It largely simulcast the programming of its sister station, WORI 1550 AM, a daytimer that is now silent. When the AM station had to sign off at sunset, WOKI-FM could continue its Top 40 hits into the night. WOKI-AM-FM were owned by Radioak, Inc., with studios on Tulsa Road in Oak Ridge.

=== WNOX-FM ===
Dick Broadcasting acquired 99.1 WNOX-FM in Loudon, which became a simulcast signal for the talk radio programming heard on WIVK 990 AM. Shortly thereafter, the 990 call letters were changed back to WNOX (now WNML). The two stations, 990 AM & 99.1 FM, were jointly called "NewsTalk99 WNOX." The stations' local morning show was hosted by Ed Brantley and Bob Thomas. In afternoon drive time, Terry Fair and Russell Smith were heard. Syndicated hosts were carried the rest of the day including Neal Boortz, Dave Ramsey, Laura Ingraham and Jerry Doyle. In 2005, the station moved its talk format to 100.3 MHz, the former WOKI-FM. 990 AM and 99.1 FM then became sports radio WNML and WNML-FM, known as "The Sports Animal."

Citadel Broadcasting ended its lease agreement with Oak Ridge FM, Inc. for the 100.3 WNOX frequency two years early and announced that it would be broadcasting the programming of WNOX on both 100.3 WNOX-FM and 98.7 WOKI from July 9, 2010, until August 1, 2010. On July 7, 2010, Oak Ridge FM announced plans for WNOX to stay news/talk, but with different hosts. Ed Brantley, the former general manager of the Knoxville Citadel radio group and previous WIVK-FM DJ, was hired as general manager of 100.3 FM, and John Pirkle of Oak Ridge FM said he would be an on-air personality.

On July 19, 2010, WNOX moved its former programming to 98.7 WOKI, with 100.3 FM airing nothing but reminders that former WNOX listeners should tune to 98.7, its new frequency. On August 1, 2010, the station's owner, Oak Ridge FM, Inc. regained programming control of the station and resumed broadcasting a news/talk format.

=== WCYQ ===
On May 3, 2013, the sale of the station to Journal Broadcast Group closed. Upon taking possession, WNOX began stunting towards a new format to be launched on May 9, 2013. The talk programming moved to WKVL 850 AM in Knoxville. The country format of WCYQ moved to 100.3 permanently after simulcasting for two weeks. A classic hits format was launched on 93.1 in Karns, Tennessee, on May 23, 2013. On May 9, 2013, WNOX changed its call letters to WCYQ, swapping call signs with 93.1 FM, which became WNOX.

Journal Communications and the E. W. Scripps Company announced on July 30, 2014, that the two companies would merge to create a new broadcast company under the E. W. Scripps Company name that owned the two companies' broadcast properties, including WCYQ. The transaction was completed in 2015, pending shareholder and regulatory approvals. Scripps exited radio in 2018. The Knoxville stations went to SummitMedia in a four-market, $47 million deal completed on November 1, 2018.

On September 19, 2019, after stunting with construction sounds. WCYQ rebranded as "100.3 The Wolf". In November 2021, Scott Grimes was named the Operations Manager of SummitMedia's Knoxville stations and Program Director of 100.3 WCYQ. Nine months later, Grimes departed WCYQ and SummitMedia Knoxville.
