= WKCE =

WKCE may refer to:

- WKCE (AM), a radio station (1180 AM) licensed to serve Knoxville, Tennessee, United States
- WTLT, a radio station (1120 AM) licensed to serve Maryville, Tennessee, which held the call sign WKCE from 1995 to 2018
