= WKFN (disambiguation) =

WKFN is a radio station (540 AM) licensed to Clarksville, Tennessee.

WKFN may also refer to:

- WVOK-FM, a radio station (97.9 FM) licensed to Oxford, Alabama, which held the call sign WKFN from 1990 to 1992
- WMTY (AM), a defunct radio station (670 AM) licensed to Farragut, Tennessee, which held the call sign WKFN from 1999 to 2002
- WQEZ, a radio station (1370 AM) licensed to Fort Campbell, Kentucky, which held the call sign WKFN from 2003 to 2005
