= WEMQ =

WEMQ refers to the following broadcasting stations in the United States:

- WEMQ-LP, a defunct low-power radio station (92.1 FM) licensed to Horsham, Pennsylvania
- WKHT, a radio station (104.5 FM) licensed to Belton, South Carolina, which held the call sign WEMQ from 1991 to 1993
