= WDEH =

- Sweetwater, Tennessee; United States
- Frequency: 800 kHz
- Branding: Spirit of the Volunteer Valley

Programming
- Format: Religious

Ownership
- Owner: Horne Radio, LLC
- Sister stations: WFIV, WMTY

Technical information
- Licensing authority: FCC
- Facility ID: 39377
- Class: B
- Power: 1,000 watts day 379 watts night
- Transmitter coordinates: 35°36′49.00″N 84°27′33.00″W

Links
- Public license information: Public file; LMS
- Webcast: Listen live
- Website: wdehradio.com

WDEH (800 AM, "Spirit of the Volunteer Valley") is a radio station broadcasting a religious format. Licensed to Sweetwater, Tennessee, United States, the station is currently owned by Horne Radio, LLC.

== Notable contributors ==
- Tom Rowland, former broadcaster who became mayor of Cleveland, Tennessee
