= WWST =

- Sevierville, Tennessee; United States
- Broadcast area: Knoxville, Tennessee
- Frequency: 102.1 MHz (HD Radio)
- Branding: Star 102.1

Programming
- Format: Contemporary hit radio
- Affiliations: Premiere Networks

Ownership
- Owner: SummitMedia; (SM-WWST, LLC)
- Sister stations: WNOX; WKHT; WCYQ

History
- First air date: 1978
- Former call signs: WSEV-FM (1978–1981); WMYU (1981–2001)
- Call sign meaning: Star

Technical information
- Licensing authority: FCC
- Facility ID: 29727
- Class: C1
- ERP: 15,000 watts
- HAAT: 603 meters (1,978 ft)
- Transmitter coordinates: 35°48′41″N 83°40′8″W

Links
- Public license information: Public file; LMS
- Webcast: Listen live
- Website: www.star1021fm.com

WWST (102.1 FM, "Star 102.1") is a radio station licensed to Sevierville, Tennessee, and serving the Knoxville market. The station is owned by SummitMedia. The station is a top 40 (CHR) station that broadcasts with 15,000 watts of power and is known on-air as "Star 102.1".

== History ==
The station was known as WSEV-FM–the FM sister station to WSEV (930 AM) in Sevierville, Tennessee–in its early years and was automated. In 1981, the station started playing a mix of adult contemporary and country music as "U-102". Eventually, the station started playing adult contemporary exclusively.

=== WMYU and WWST frequency swap ===
WMYU had been on the 102.1 frequency since 1981. They were known as U102 and listed in the Tennessee Football program as a station that carried the Vol Network football broadcast identified as WMYU Sevierville/Knoxville. They were also the official sponsoring station of Boomsday which takes place on Sunday night before Labor Day and started back in 1986.

The "Star" branding and WWST call sign originated in 1994 on 93.1 FM. On March 9, 2001, the two stations swapped frequencies: WWST moved to 102.1 FM as Star 102.1, while the WMYU call letters moved to 93.1 FM where they remained until late 2008.

Journal Communications and the E. W. Scripps Company announced on July 30, 2014, that the two companies would merge to create a new broadcast company under the E. W. Scripps Company name that owned the two companies' broadcast properties, including WWST. The transaction was completed in 2015, pending shareholder and regulatory approvals. Scripps exited radio in 2018; the Knoxville stations went to SummitMedia in a four-market, $47 million deal completed on November 1, 2018.
