= WIVK-FM =

Knoxville, Tennessee; United States
- Broadcast area: East Tennessee
- Frequency: 107.7 MHz
- Branding: 107.7 WIVK

Programming
- Format: Country
- Affiliations: University of Tennessee Vol Network; Westwood One

Ownership
- Owner: Cumulus Media; (Radio License Holding CBC, LLC)
- Sister stations: WNML, WNML-FM, WOKI

History
- First air date: December 16, 1965
- Call sign meaning: Adapted from the former WIVK (AM)

Technical information
- Licensing authority: FCC
- Facility ID: 16890
- Class: C
- ERP: 91,000 watts
- HAAT: 633 meters (2,077 ft)
- Transmitter coordinates: 35°48′41.00″N 83°40′10.00″W

Links
- Public license information: Public file; LMS
- Webcast: Listen live
- Website: wivk.com

WIVK-FM (107.7 MHz) is a commercial radio station licensed to Knoxville, Tennessee, United States. The station is owned by Cumulus Media and broadcasts a country music format known as "107.7 WIVK {wih-vik}" The studios are on Old Kingston Pike in the Sequoyah Hills section of West Knoxville. WIVK is also an affiliate station for the Vol Network, carrying Tennessee Volunteers football and basketball.

The transmitter is atop Greentop Knob on Chilhowee Mountain near Pigeon Forge.

== History ==
WIVK-FM signed on the air on December 16, 1965. It was a simulcast of the country format on co-owned WIVK 850 AM. Because the AM station is a daytimer, its format could continue on 107.7 FM after sunset. For several decades, the two stations aired a morning show hosted by Claude "The Cat" Tomlinson. He also served as the program director and promotions director.

The simulcast briefly ended when the AM station switched to a full service, adult contemporary format, becoming WHIG. Many listeners were not happy, so the adult contemporary format on WHIG was short-lived. The WIVK simulcast on 107.7 FM and 850 AM returned. On September 1, 1988, WIVK 850 AM signal was donated to the University of Tennessee and became a news/talk station as WUTK. WIVK moved its AM simulcast to another station at 990 kHz on the same day and the simulcast continued.

For most of the 1980s and 1990s, WIVK-AM-FM were owned by Dick Broadcasting, with James A. Dick as the chairman. The stations were acquired by Citadel Broadcasting in the early 2000s. In 2011, Citadel was merged into Cumulus Media.

The AM 990/FM 107.7 simulcast lasted almost nine years. In 1997, AM 990 switched to a talk format as "NewsTalk 990 WNOX" and later "NewsTalk 99". Today AM 990 is "The Sports Animal" which covers University of Tennessee athletics as well as national pro and college sports.

WIVK-FM is consistently one of the Knoxville radio market's top stations, usually ranked #1 or #2 in the Nielsen ratings. It has received numerous Country Music Association, Academy of Country Music, Associated Press, NAB Marconi and RTNDA Edward R. Murrow Awards.
