= WGAP =

- Maryville, Tennessee; United States
- Broadcast area: Knoxville metropolitan area
- Frequency: 1400 kHz
- Branding: 105.9 Greg FM

Programming
- Format: Adult hits
- Affiliations: Compass Media Networks; United Stations Radio Networks

Ownership
- Owner: Loud Media LLC
- Sister stations: WATO, WTLT, WKVL, WKCE, WVLZ

History
- First air date: August 13, 1947

Technical information
- Licensing authority: FCC
- Facility ID: 72087
- Class: C
- Power: 1,000 watts (unlimited)
- Transmitter coordinates: 35°45′41″N 83°58′57″W
- Translator: 105.9 W290DJ (Maryville)

Links
- Public license information: Public file; LMS
- Webcast: Listen live
- Website: 1059gregfm.com

WGAP (1400 AM) is a commercial radio station licensed to Maryville, Tennessee, United States, and serving the Knoxville metropolitan area. It broadcasts an adult hits format. WGAP is owned by Loud Media LLC, with studios in the Sunsphere tower on Clinch Avenue in Knoxville.

Programming is also heard on FM translator W290DJ (105.9 FM) in Maryville.

== History ==
The station signed on the air on August 13, 1947. It has always used the call sign WGAP. It was owned by Blount Broadcasting with studios and offices in the Gateway National Bank. The power was only 250 watts.

On April 15, 2022, the Blount Broadcasting Corporation announced that it had come to an agreement to sell WGAP, its sister station WKVL (850 AM), and two translators to Loud Media. The sale was consummated on August 17, 2022. On August 22, 2022, WGAP changed its format from classic country to variety hits, branded as "Random Music Radio", simulcasting WKVL.

On September 20, 2023, WGAP switched from variety hits to classic hits. It uses the dial position of its FM translator, calling itself "Fun 105.9".

On October 9, 2025, after a brief period of stunting with hold music, WGAP switched from classic hits to alternative rock, simulcasting sister station WATO. The two stations brand as "Atomic 106".

On June 9, 2026, WGAP dropped their simulcast with WATO and started broadcasting an adult hits format, under the moniker "105.9 Greg FM", referring to their translator. The format is based around Canadian radio personality Greg Beharrell, and has been described by Loud Media as "built around the humor, storytelling, observations, and offbeat perspective of internationally syndicated radio personality Greg Beharrell."
