= WFIV-FM =

- Loudon, Tennessee; United States
- Broadcast area: Knoxville, Tennessee
- Frequency: 105.3 MHz
- Branding: 105.3 WFIV

Programming
- Format: Oldies

Ownership
- Owner: Douglas and Susan Horne; (Horne Radio, LLC)
- Sister stations: WMTY, WDEH

History
- First air date: 1990 (as WJDG)
- Former call signs: WKVL-FM (2001–2005); WESK (1998–2001)(3/1991–5/1991); WXST (5/1991-1998); WJDG (1990–1991)
- Call sign meaning: We're Farragut's Independent Voice

Technical information
- Licensing authority: FCC
- Facility ID: 65151
- Class: A
- ERP: 6,000 watts
- HAAT: 100 meters (330 ft)
- Transmitter coordinates: 35°48′40″N 84°16′2″W

Links
- Public license information: Public file; LMS
- Webcast: Listen live
- Website: wfiv.com

WFIV-FM (105.3 FM) is a radio station broadcasting an oldies format. Licensed to the suburb of Loudon, Tennessee it serves the Knoxville metropolitan area including Farragut. It first began broadcasting in 1990 under the call sign WJDG. The station is currently owned by Horne Radio.

== History ==
After being assigned the call sign "WJDG" on April 13, 1990, WFIV-FM changed call signs briefly to "WESK" in March 1991. In May 1991 the call sign was again changed to "WXST" but was changed back to "WESK" on March 16, 1998. In February 2000 the station adopted an '80s format with the call sign WKVL-FM; the station would switch from talk back to 80s music many times up until November 1, 2005. That is when the station switched to the WFIV-FM call sign.

WFIV adopted an eclectic variety format, referred to by the radio industry as Adult Album Alternative (AAA).

Syndicated programming on WFIV included The House of Blues Hour, as well as Little Steven's Underground Garage hosted by Little Steven.

On March 1, 2010, the station "relaunched" as "i-105," "Knoxville's Independent Radio", maintaining the Adult Alternative format but dropping any reference to their actual studio location in Farragut.

On September 4, 2020, WFIV changed formats from adult alternative to oldies, branded as "105.3 WFIV".
