= WKHT =

Radio station in Knoxville, Tennessee

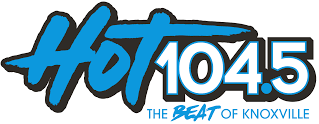
- Knoxville, Tennessee; United States
- Broadcast area: Knoxville metropolitan area
- Frequency: 104.5 MHz (HD Radio)
- Branding: Hot 104.5

Programming
- Format: Rhythmic Top 40

Ownership
- Owner: SummitMedia; (SM-WKHT, LLC)
- Sister stations: WCYQ, WNOX, WWST

History
- First air date: November 1991; 34 years ago
- Former call signs: WEMQ (1991–1993); WQBB-FM (1993–1998); WQIX (1998–2000); WBON (2000–2003)
- Call sign meaning: We're Knoxville's Hot 104.5!

Technical information
- Licensing authority: FCC
- Facility ID: 40854
- Class: A
- ERP: 1,400 watts
- HAAT: 209.1 meters (686 ft)
- Transmitter coordinates: 36°0′10″N 83°56′40″W

Links
- Public license information: Public file; LMS
- Webcast: Listen Live
- Website: hot1045.net

WKHT (104.5 FM) is a rhythmic Top 40 station based in Knoxville, Tennessee. The SummitMedia outlet broadcasts with an ERP of 1.4 kW.

== History ==
This station signed on in November 1991 as WEMQ, later on as WQBB-FM, airing the same programming as adult standards WQBB. Later the FM played "Young country" as WQIX.

Prior to its flip to Rhythmic Top 40 in July 2003, the station was a Classic Rock outlet as "104.5 The Bone". HOT 104.5 has enjoyed success. In less than two years on the air HOT 104.5 forced its competitor WILD 98.7/WYIL to change formats. Currently HOT 104.5's only competitor is sister station Top 40 Mainstream WWST.

The playlist of WKHT primarily consists of R&B/hip-hop plus some Rhythmic Pop hits; thus it is considered to be a rhythmic Top 40 station by Billboard as opposed to mainstream R&B. This is due to the fact that Knoxville does not have a large African-American population. Its target audience is females 18-34.

Journal Communications and the E. W. Scripps Company announced on July 30, 2014, that the two companies would merge to create a new broadcast company under the E.W. Scripps Company name that owned the two companies' broadcast properties, including WKHT. The transaction was completed in 2015, pending shareholder and regulatory approvals. Scripps exited radio in 2018; the Knoxville stations went to SummitMedia in a four-market, $47 million deal completed on November 1, 2018.
