= WNML (AM) =

Sports radio station in Knoxville, Tennessee, United States

- Knoxville, Tennessee; United States
- Broadcast area: East Tennessee
- Frequency: 990 kHz
- Branding: 99.1 The Sports Animal

Programming
- Format: Sports
- Affiliations: Infinity Sports Network; Tennessee Smokies Radio Network; Tennessee Volunteers' "Vol Network"

Ownership
- Owner: Cumulus Media; (Radio License Holding CBC, LLC)
- Sister stations: WIVK, WOKI, WNML-FM

History
- First air date: November 3, 1922; 103 years ago (as WNAV)
- Former call signs: WNAV (1922–1925); WNOX (1925–1988); WTNZ (1988); WIVK (1988–1997); WNOX (1997–2005)
- Call sign meaning: "Animal"

Technical information
- Licensing authority: FCC
- Facility ID: 16894
- Class: B
- Power: 10,000 watts
- Transmitter coordinates: 36°02′33.00″N 83°53′59.00″W

Links
- Public license information: Public file; LMS
- Webcast: Listen live
- Website: 991thesportsanimal.com

WNML (990 kHz) is a commercial AM radio station in Knoxville, Tennessee. It is owned by Cumulus Media and it simulcasts a sports radio format with co-owned 99.1 WNML-FM Friendsville. The studios and offices are on Old Kingston Pike in the Sequoyah Hills section of West Knoxville.

During the day, WNML transmits 10,000 watts non-directional. However, 990 AM is a Canadian clear channel frequency, so at night, to avoid interference with other stations, WNML uses a directional antenna with a four-tower array. The transmitter site is on Anderson Road in Knoxville, off Tazewell Pike.

== Programming ==
WNML-AM-FM have mostly local sports shows on weekdays with CBS Sports Radio heard nights and weekends. WNML-AM-FM are the flagship radio stations for both the Tennessee Smokies Southern League Baseball radio network and the University of Tennessee Vol Network. The stations also carry Knoxville Ice Bears games in the Southern Professional Hockey League.

== History ==
=== WNAV ===
WNML is the oldest radio station in Knoxville and one of the oldest in Tennessee. The first formal regulations establishing radio broadcasting in the United States were adopted by the Department of Commerce effective December 1, 1921. During the next year, over 500 stations were created. A notice in the October 3, 1922, issue of the Knoxville News reported that: "The Peoples' Telephone and Telegraph Company is experimenting with its new radio broadcasting station. If perfected, this will be the first broadcasting station operating in East Tennessee."

Peoples' was a local Knoxville telephone company, and after the initial tests proved successful, it was issued its first station license on November 3, 1922. It was given the sequentially assigned call letters WNAV. The News further reported that: "J. C. Duncan, president of the Peoples' Telephone and Telegraph Co., announced Monday that the radio station at the telephone building, Commerce-av had passed the government regulations and is known as WNAV. 'By next Sunday we expect to have a program worked out to be broadcasted,' Duncan said."

In its initial years WNAV had a limited schedule, and after a period of inactivity was deleted in June 1924. However, the following April it was relicensed to Peoples' Telephone and Telegraph, again with the WNAV call letters.

=== WNOX ===
On August 26, 1925, WNAV's call sign was changed to WNOX. Two months later, in late October 1925, the station was destroyed by a major fire on the roof of Peoples' Telephone and Telegraph. According to J. C. Duncan, the station's $20,000 in equipment was "a total loss". WNOX was back on the air within a week, transmitting over a 100-watt temporary transmitter, with plans to rebuild the destroyed facility. Later that month it was announced that the rebuilt station would be located atop the Sterchi Brothers building near the Gay Street viaduct.

The early WNAV studios were located in the St. James Hotel, which once stood on Market Square. In June 1928, WNOX was purchased by the Sterchi Brothers furniture chain. The Sterchi Brothers sold the station to Scripps-Howard, owner of the Knoxville News-Sentinel,in 1935. WNOX moved to the Andrew Johnson Hotel on Gay Street, with its main offices located on the hotel's 17th floor. The station's growing studio audiences began causing elevator traffic issues for the hotel. Hotel management asked the station to move. WNOX relocated to a small tabernacle building at the north end of Gay Street, where it remained for several years. The station's frequency changed many times, eventually settling at AM 990 in March 1941 with the implementation of the North American Regional Broadcasting Agreement.

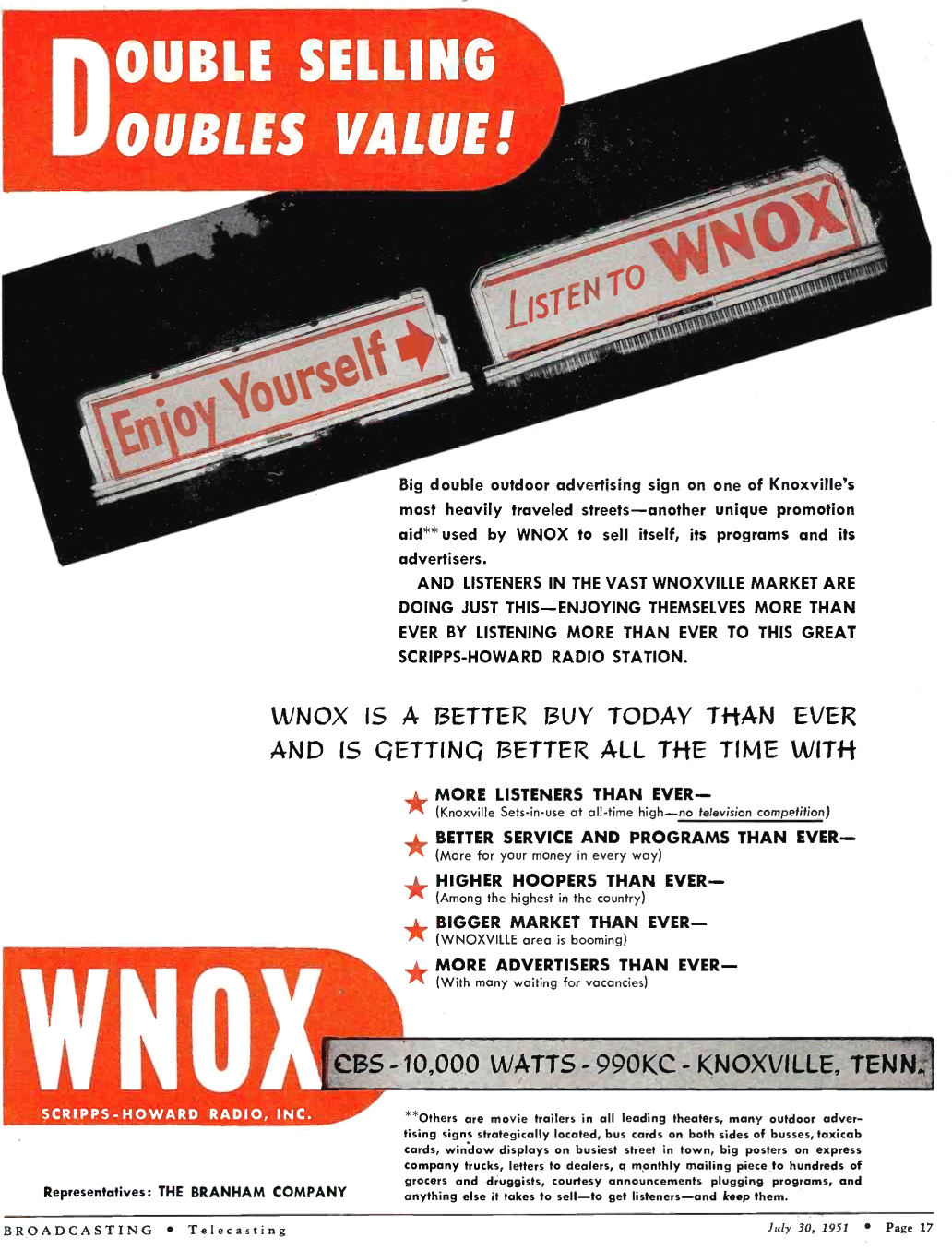
1951 station advertisement

In the 1950s and 1960s, WNOX was home to the popular lunchtime program The Midday Merry-go-Round and weekend program The Tennessee Barndance, which were both influential in the early days of country music. Legendary station manager Lowell Blanchard hosted the programs for many years in downtown Knoxville, and lunch crowds packed the station's downtown auditorium to see the weekday programs. Seeking a bigger performance area, WNOX moved its studios to Whittle Springs Road in north Knoxville. The Whittle Springs facility included a large auditorium for live performances. But after the move from downtown, the live musical performances were never the same. Once the crowds diminished, the live performances were called off.

The owners of WNOX also had other, much bigger plans for their new facility on Whittle Springs Road. In 1955, Scripps-Howard Broadcasting was one of the applicants for the Channel 10 television frequency, awarded to Knoxville after the Federal Communications Commission (FCC) reorganized its U.S. TV table of channel allocations in 1952. So sure of getting the Channel 10 license, the company poured thousands of dollars into the Whittle Springs building to make it a top-notch radio-TV studio combination. By this time, however, the FCC was increasingly wary of newspapers owning broadcasting outlets. With this in mind, it awarded the TV license to a consortium headed by the Nunn family, local owners of WBIR AM and -FM, who used it to launch WBIR-TV in 1956. Scripps-Howard was now saddled with a huge studio to ultimately be used just for radio, amid a dwindling live listening audience. Still, the station remained there for many years, less than two miles (3 km) from its transmitter site.

The 1960s brought a new era for WNOX. The station became a popular Top 40 station, and remained that way until the late 1970s, when the station switched to full service Adult Contemporary music. In the early 1980s, the station was bought again. The new owners returned the country music format.

=== WTNZ ===
WNOX's historic call letters were changed to WTNZ in 1988. However, within a few months, Dick Broadcasting, at that time operating WIVK (now WSMM) on AM 850, which was limited to daytime-only broadcasting, purchased WTNZ 990 AM, which had a fulltime license.

=== WIVK ===
Dick donated the original WIVK on AM 850 to the University of Tennessee. He then renamed WTNZ to WIVK, and began simulcasting the programming of 107.7 WIVK-FM. Within a few years, WIVK 990 began adding some talk radio programming, eventually transitioning to an all-talk format.

=== WNOX ===
From 1997 to 2005 the station returned to using the historic WNOX call letters.

=== WNML ===
In 2005, the station adopted a sports radio format under the call sign of WNML. Those call letters were chosen to represent the word "animal" with the station known as "The Sports Animal." At first, the station was an affiliate of Yahoo! Sports Radio. Then on January 2, 2013, WNML became an affiliate of the CBS Sports Radio Network, along with many radio stations owned by Cumulus Media.

Beginning in 2023, a change in the daily lineup was announced with the debut of “Tyler Ivens and Will West" in afternoon drive time.

== Former logo ==
Logo used 2015-2020
