= WKVL (FM) =

- Greenback, Tennessee; United States
- Broadcast area: Knoxville metropolitan area
- Frequency: 104.9 MHz
- Branding: 104.9 KVL

Programming
- Format: Variety hits
- Affiliations: Compass Media Networks

Ownership
- Owner: Loud Media LLC
- Sister stations: WKCE, WGAP, WATO, WVLZ, WTLT

History
- First air date: August 2, 1982; 43 years ago
- Former call signs: WQLA (1982–1991); WQLA-FM (1991–2008); WTNQ (2008–2021); WPLA (2021–2023)

Technical information
- Licensing authority: FCC
- Facility ID: 36230
- Class: A
- ERP: 439 watts
- HAAT: 361 meters (1,184 ft)
- Transmitter coordinates: 35°38′12″N 83°56′04″W

Links
- Public license information: Public file; LMS
- Webcast: Listen live
- Website: www.1049kvl.com

WKVL (104.9 MHz) is a commercial FM radio station licensed to Greenback, Tennessee, and serving the Knoxville metropolitan area. It is owned by Loud Media. WKVL has its radio studios and offices on the fifth floor of The Sunsphere in Knoxville.

== History ==
The station signed on the air as WQLA on June 13, 1985. It changed its call sign to WQLA-FM on November 1, 1991, and to WTNQ on May 16, 2008.

On May 27, 2020, it was announced the station was to be acquired by Loud Media. On June 26, 2020, Loud Media took over the signal, which began stunting by playing 1960s, 1970s and 1980s music with a pending launch of a new format. At midnight on June 29, 2020, the station premiered a classic country format. It was called "Q104.9", with the tag line "Tennessee’s Throwback Country".

The sale to Loud Media was consummated on November 20, 2020. On November 22, 2020, WTNQ dropped its classic country format and began playing Christmas music for the holiday season, branded as "Santa 104.9". At 1 p.m. on December 27, 2020, WTNQ became "104.9 Lake FM" with the slogan "Knoxville's Greatest Hits" playing a classic hits format. Loud Media has previously used its Lake FM format and branding in other radio markets located in Upstate New York. On July 13, 2021, the station adopted the call sign WPLA to match the format.

On September 20, 2023, WPLA dropped its classic hits format (which moved to WGAP) and began stunting towards a new format to launch on September 22 at 5 a.m. under a new WKVL call sign. At the promised time, the call sign was changed and WKVL relaunched as "104.9 KVL", which focuses on a 1990s and 2000s gold based-CHR playlist with the tagline "'90s and 2000s Throwbacks!" and airs very limited recent material.

In October 2025, WKVL added 80s tracks to its playlist in addition to its 90s and 2000s hits, as well as some 2010s tracks.
