= WATO (FM) =

- Oliver Springs, Tennessee; United States
- Broadcast area: Knoxville metropolitan area
- Frequency: 106.1 MHz
- Branding: Atomic 106

Programming
- Format: Alternative rock
- Affiliations: Compass Media Networks; United Stations Radio Networks

Ownership
- Owner: Loud Media LLC
- Sister stations: WKCE; WKVL; WTLT; WGAP; WVLZ

History
- First air date: 2009 (as WJRV)
- Former call signs: WJZO (2008–2009); WJRV (2009–2020); WSMM (2020–2024)
- Call sign meaning: "Atomic"

Technical information
- Licensing authority: FCC
- Facility ID: 170987
- Class: A
- ERP: 190 watts
- HAAT: 532.4 meters (1,747 ft)
- Transmitter coordinates: 36°6′29″N 84°20′8″W
- Repeater: 1400 WGAP (Maryville)

Links
- Public license information: Public file; LMS
- Webcast: Listen live
- Website: www.atomic106.com

WATO (106.1 MHz) is a commercial FM radio station licensed to Oliver Springs, Tennessee, and serving the Knoxville metropolitan area. It is owned by Loud Media and broadcasts an alternative rock format branded as "Atomic 106".

WATO is a Class A station, with an effective radiated power of 190 watts. The studios are on the fifth floor of the Sunsphere in Knoxville.

As of December 2025, the weekday presenter lineup consists of The TJ Show, Woodhouse, and Dave Kelly.

== History ==
The station signed on the air in 2009 as WJRV. The station aired a hot adult contemporary music format branded as "106.1 The River".

On May 27, 2020, it was announced that the station was to be acquired by Loud Media. On June 26, 2020, Loud Media launched "106.1 VLZ" with an active rock format. The station changed its call sign on July 1, 2020, to WVLZ.

On October 21, 2024, WVLZ dropped its active rock format, which moved to WSMM (850 AM), and began stunting towards a new format to be launched on October 25, 2024, under new WATO call letters. At 1:06 pm that day, WATO launched an alternative rock format branded as "Atomic 106".
