= WNML-FM =

Friendsville, Tennessee; United States
- Broadcast area: Knoxville metropolitan area
- Frequency: 99.1 MHz
- Branding: 99.1 The Sports Animal

Programming
- Format: Sports
- Affiliations: Westwood One Sports

Ownership
- Owner: Cumulus Media; (Radio License Holding CBC, LLC)
- Sister stations: WIVK, WOKI, WNML

History
- First air date: January 5, 1989
- Former call signs: WLOD-FM (1988–1991); WNOX (1991–1997); WNOX-FM (1997–2005)
- Call sign meaning: "Animal"

Technical information
- Licensing authority: FCC
- Facility ID: 7998
- Class: A
- ERP: 6,000 watts
- HAAT: 93 meters (305 ft)
- Transmitter coordinates: 35°47′10.00″N 84°17′24.00″W

Links
- Public license information: Public file; LMS
- Webcast: Listen live
- Website: 991thesportsanimal.com

WNML-FM (99.1 FM, "99.1 The Sports Animal") is a commercial radio station licensed to Friendsville, Tennessee, United States, and serving the Knoxville metropolitan area. Owned by Cumulus Media, it features a sports format simulcast with WNML (990 AM). The studios and offices are on Old Kingston Pike in the Sequoyah Hills section of West Knoxville.

The transmitter is on Nicole Court, off U.S. Route 411, in Maryville.

== History ==
The station signed on the air on January 5, 1989. Its original call sign was WLOD-FM, and its city of license was Loudon, Tennessee. It was owned by Dick Broadcasting, with Allen Dick as the chief executive officer. In 1991, WNOX-AM-FM and WIVK-FM were acquired by Citadel Broadcasting, which later merged with current owner Cumulus Media. WLOD-FM changed its call letters to WNOX-FM.

Over the years, formats included smooth jazz ("Double 99", simulcast with WNDD) and urban adult contemporary (X-99). Later, WNOX-FM started simulcasting talk radio station WNOX 990 AM.

== Programming ==
Most programming comes from Westwood One Sports. WNML-AM-FM are the flagship stations for both the Tennessee Smokies Southern League Baseball radio network and the University of Tennessee Vol Network. The stations also carry Knoxville Ice Bears games in the Southern Professional Hockey League.

Logo from 2015-2020
