= WMTY (AM) =

DWMTY
Farragut, Tennessee; United States
- Frequency: 670 kHz

Programming
- Format: Defunct (formerly Oldies)

Ownership
- Owner: Horne Radio, LLC
- Sister stations: WMTY-FM

History
- First air date: 1987
- Last air date: September 30, 2015
- Former call signs: WBAV (1987); WTNN (1987–1999); WKFN (1999–2002)

Technical information
- Facility ID: 3992
- Class: D
- Power: 2,500 watts day
- Transmitter coordinates: 35°53′12.00″N 84°14′48.00″W

WMTY (670 AM) was a radio station licensed to Farragut, Tennessee, United States. The station was last owned by Horne Radio, LLC.

The station went silent on December 20, 2014, and the three towers were taken down in March 2015. On September 24, 2015, Horne Radio surrendered WMTY's license to the Federal Communications Commission (FCC); the FCC cancelled the license and deleted the WMTY call sign on September 30, 2015.
