= WKCE (AM) =

- Knoxville, Tennessee; United States
- Broadcast area: Knoxville metropolitan area
- Frequency: 1180 kHz
- Branding: 92.5 & 1180 WKCE

Programming
- Format: Oldies
- Affiliations: ABC News Radio; Knoxville Ice Bears; Knoxville Smokies

Ownership
- Owner: Loud Media; (Mid-Century Radio LLC)
- Sister stations: WKVL, WTLT, WVLZ, WGAP, WATO

History
- First air date: June 1, 1988; 37 years ago (as WHJM)
- Former call signs: WHJM (1987–2002); WVLZ (2002–2018)

Technical information
- Licensing authority: FCC
- Facility ID: 43771
- Class: D
- Power: 10,000 watts day; 2,600 watts critical hours
- Transmitter coordinates: 35°58′48″N 83°49′9″W
- Translator: 92.5 W223DM (Sevierville)

Links
- Public license information: Public file; LMS
- Webcast: Listen live
- Website: www.wkceradio.com

WKCE (1180 kHz) is a commercial AM radio station in Knoxville, Tennessee. It is owned by Loud Media and it airs an oldies radio format. The station is branded as 92.5 WKCE, referring to its FM translator's dial position. The studios and offices are on the fifth floor of the Sunsphere in Knoxville.

WKCE operates at 10,000 watts by day, using a non-directional antenna. Because AM 1180 is a clear-channel frequency, reserved for Class Astation WHAM in Rochester, New York, WKCE must reduce power to 2,600 watts during critical hours and sign-off at night. The AM transmitter is located off Strawberry Plains Pike in Knoxville.

== History ==
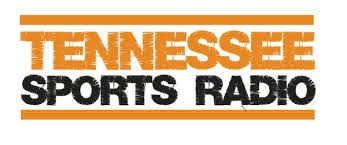
Former logo for WVLZ during an earlier stint as a sports station.

A construction permit to build a radio station on AM 1180 was first issued in December 1986. On June 1, 1988, WHJM first signed on. It was owned by Morgan Broadcasting Company, and was an affiliate of the former Satellite Music Network's "Pure Gold" service, playing oldies from the 1960s and 70s. Studios and offices were located at 802 S. Central Avenue in downtown Knoxville.

By 1990, the station had changed formats from oldies to adult standards, using SMN's Stardust music service. In 1993, WHJM changed its format to Christian country and southern gospel music. Later, the station was programmed as a talk radio outlet.

Morgan Broadcasting Co., of which Harry Morgan was president, sold WHJM and WKCE to Kirkland Wireless Broadcasters, Inc. for $400,000, in a deal reported February 24, 2002. Upon acquisition, the station's call letters were changed to WVLZ.

From January 2009 until August 29, 2014, WVLZ was known as "Tennessee Sports Radio". Many of the station's previous local sports talk shows were about Tennessee Volunteers football. The station's show hosts included former University of Tennessee quarterback Erik Ainge and former UT wide receiver Jayson Swain.

On August 29, 2014, WVLZ changed branding and reverted to its earlier format as "Oldies 1180", but returned to sports as "Sports Radio 1180 The VLZ" on Monday, January 5, 2015.

Kirkland Wireless Broadcasters sold WVLZ to John Pirkle's Oak Ridge FM, Inc. The sale was effective July 11, 2018, for $30,000. The station changed its call sign to WKCE on September 19, 2018, and returned to oldies. The station plays hits of the 1960s and 1970s.

Effective December 31, 2018, Oak Ridge FM, Inc sold the station to Mid-Century Radio LLC.
