= WTLT =

Radio station in Maryville–Knoxville, Tennessee

- Maryville, Tennessee; United States
- Broadcast area: Knoxville metropolitan area
- Frequency: 1120 kHz
- Branding: Jump 97.1

Programming
- Language: English
- Format: Classic hip hop
- Affiliations: Compass Media Networks; United Stations Radio Networks

Ownership
- Owner: Loud Media; (Mid-Century Radio LLC)
- Operator: One Major Media LLC
- Sister stations: WGAP, WKCE, WVLZ, WKVL, WATO

History
- First air date: 1989
- Former call signs: WDOZ (1985); WCGM (1985–1995); WKCE (1995–2018); WVLZ (2018–2020); WJMP (2020–2021)
- Call sign meaning: "Tennessee Lit"

Technical information
- Licensing authority: FCC
- Facility ID: 17472
- Class: D
- Power: 1,000 watts (days only)
- Transmitter coordinates: 35°45′08″N 83°55′04″W
- Translator: 97.1 W246DH (Knoxville)

Links
- Public license information: Public file; LMS
- Webcast: Listen live
- Website: jumpradio.com/knoxville

WTLT (1120 AM) is a commercial radio station licensed to Maryville, Tennessee, United States, and serving the Knoxville radio market. It airs a classic hip hop format and is owned by Loud Media and operated by One Major Media LLC under via LMA.

WTLT operates during the daytime hours only, but is relayed around the clock over low-power FM translator W246DH (97.1 FM).

== History ==
The station signed on as WCGM in 1989. It aired a Christian radio format and was owned by Dove, Inc.

From 2007 to 2009, the then-WKCE had been a Spanish-language sports radio station as an ESPN Deportes Radio affiliate. Then it was an English-language sports station from 2010 to 2014. It aired a comedy radio format until January 2015, when the format changed to oldies.

WKCE changed briefly to an all-news radio format under the moniker "1120 News Now" on July 4, 2015. WKCE returned to oldies on December 5, 2015.

The station changed its call sign to WVLZ on September 19, 2018. On March 18, 2019, WVLZ changed its format from oldies (after stunting with Christmas music and variety hits) to active rock, branded as "101.5 VLZ" (simulcasting on FM translator W268BP (101.5 FM)). WVLZ also began simulcasting on translator W246DH (97.1 FM) shortly thereafter, and this became the sole translator in February 2020.

On July 1, 2020, the call sign was changed to WJMP and the radio station rebranded as "Jump 97.1", with a classic hip hop format. The WJMP call letters were moved by Loud Media to start a second Jump station in Plattsburgh, New York, on October 1, 2021, with the former WJMP becoming WTLT.

On December 14, 2021, WTLT flipped to urban contemporary and rebranded as "Lit 97.1".

On September 22, 2025, WTLT returned to classic hip hop and the "Jump" moniker.
