= WNOX =

Classic Rock radio station in Karns–Knoxville, Tennessee

- Karns, Tennessee; United States
- Broadcast area: Knoxville metropolitan area
- Frequency: 93.1 MHz
- Branding: Classic Rock 93.1

Programming
- Format: Classic rock
- Affiliations: Compass Media Networks

Ownership
- Owner: SummitMedia; (SM-WNOX, LLC)
- Sister stations: WKHT; WWST; WCYQ

History
- First air date: October 3, 1988 (as WCKS)
- Former call signs: WCKS (1988–1990); WWZZ (1990–1994); WWST (1994–2001); WMYU (2001–2008); WCYQ (2008–2013)
- Call sign meaning: We're KNOXville!

Technical information
- Licensing authority: FCC
- Facility ID: 29741
- Class: A
- ERP: 2,400 watts
- HAAT: 156 meters (512 ft)
- Transmitter coordinates: 35°57′46.00″N 84°01′23.00″W

Links
- Public license information: Public file; LMS
- Webcast: Listen Live
- Website: classicrock931.fm

WNOX (93.1 FM, "Classic Rock 93.1") is a commercial radio station licensed to the suburb of Karns, Tennessee, and serving the Knoxville metropolitan area. The station is owned by SummitMedia and airs a classic rock format.

WNOX's studios and offices are on Amherst Road in Knoxville. The transmitter is off Vance Lane, also in Knoxville.

== History ==
On October 3, 1988, the station first signed on under the call sign WCKS "93 KISS-FM". The station was owned by Bill Strelitz when it aired an adult contemporary format.

The station switched call signs to WWZZ "Z-93" on December 3, 1990 when it aired an active rock format.

=== WWST and WMYU frequency swap ===
On May 20, 1994, 93.1 FM changed to Star 93.1 FM with the call sign WWST. The format remained Top 40.

On March 9, 2001, WWST and sister station WMYU (Oldies 102) swapped frequencies bringing WMYU to 93.1 FM while the WWST call sign was moved to 102.1 FM as Star 102.1. WMYU broadcast an '80s format known as "931 The Point", until November 26, 2008, when the station switched to a country music format as Q93 switching its call sign to WCYQ. On May 9, 2013, WCYQ changed its call sign to WNOX, swapping call signs with WNOX 100.3 FM Oak Ridge, Tennessee, which took the WCYQ call sign.

On May 23, 2013, WNOX split from its simulcast with country-formatted WCYQ 100.3 FM Oak Ridge. WNOX changed its format to classic hits, branded as "Classic Hits 93.1".

Journal Communications and the E. W. Scripps Company announced on July 30, 2014, that the two companies would merge to create a new broadcast company under the E.W. Scripps Company name that owned the two companies' broadcast properties, including WNOX. The transaction was completed in 2015, pending shareholder and regulatory approvals. Scripps exited radio in 2018; the Knoxville stations went to SummitMedia in a four-market, $47 million deal completed on November 1, 2018.

From November 15, 2019 until December 25, 2019, the station switched to all Christmas music. The brand was modified to "Knoxville's Greatest Hits" on December 25, 2019. On April 12, 2021, WNOX rebranded as "Awesome 93.1".

On September 7, 2023, WNOX changed its format from 1980s hits to classic rock, branded as "Classic Rock 93.1".

== Previous logos ==
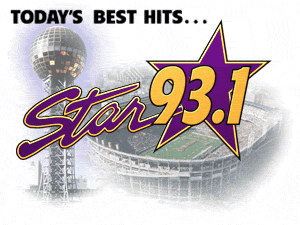
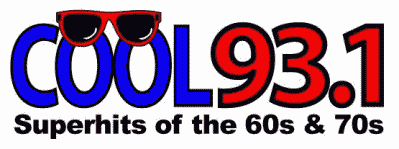
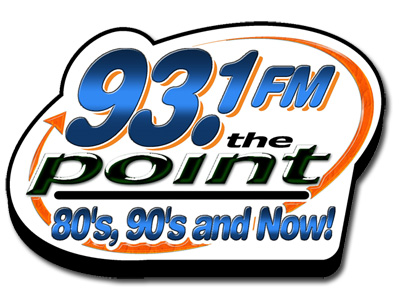
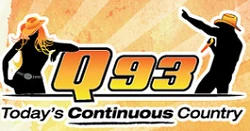
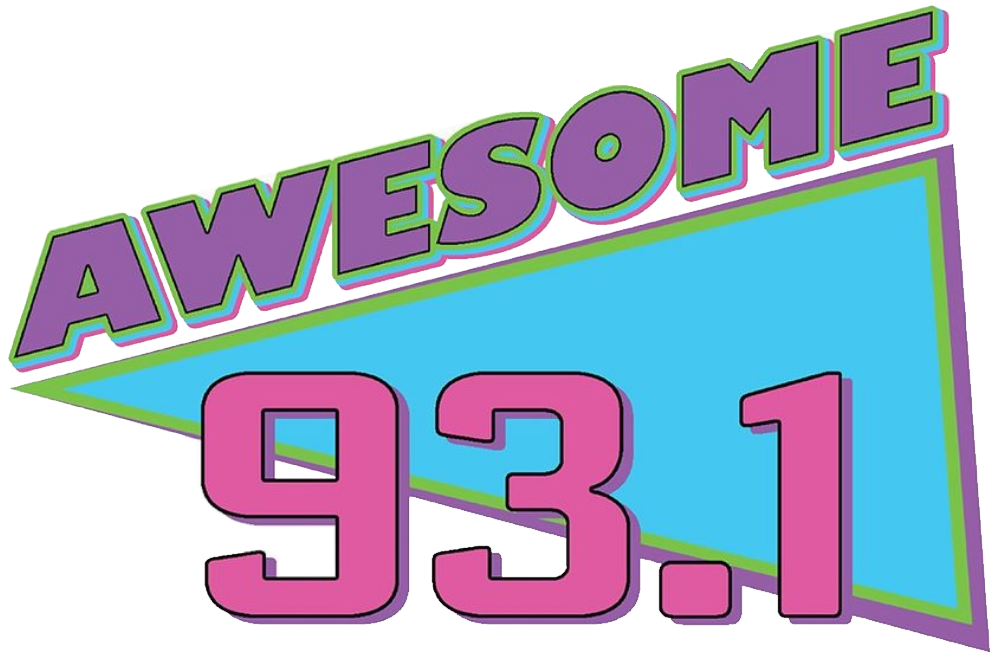
