= WMTY-FM =

- Sweetwater, Tennessee; United States
- Frequency: 98.3 MHz
- Branding: Oldies 98.3

Programming
- Format: Oldies
- Affiliations: Citadel Media

Ownership
- Owner: Horne Radio, LLC
- Sister stations: WFIV, WDEH

History
- First air date: 1967
- Former call signs: WDEH-FM (1979–2001); WLOD-FM (2001–2010)

Technical information
- Licensing authority: FCC
- Facility ID: 39378
- Class: A
- ERP: 6,000 watts
- HAAT: 41 meters (135 ft)
- Transmitter coordinates: 35°36′49.00″N 84°27′33.00″W

Links
- Public license information: Public file; LMS
- Webcast: Listen live
- Website: mytrueoldies.com

WMTY-FM (98.3 FM) is a radio station broadcasting an oldies music format. Licensed to Sweetwater, Tennessee, United States, the station is currently owned by Horne Radio, LLC and features The True Oldies Channel from Citadel Media.

On August 15, 2007, WLOD-FM changed its format from oldies to classic rock, branded as "D 98.3".

On September 1, 2010, WLOD-FM changed its format from classic rock to oldies, branded as "True Oldies". On September 15, 2010, WLOD-FM changed its call letters to WMTY-FM.
