= WVLZ (AM) =

Radio station in Maryville, Tennessee

- Maryville, Tennessee; United States
- Broadcast area: Knoxville metropolitan area
- Frequency: 850 kHz
- Branding: 93.7 WVLZ

Programming
- Format: Active rock

Ownership
- Owner: Loud Media LLC
- Sister stations: WATO, WKVL, WKCE, WGAP, WTLT

History
- First air date: March 23, 1953
- Former call signs: WIVK (1953–1984); WHIG (1984); WIVK (1984–1988); WUTK (1988–1997); WIOL (1997–1998); WJBZ (1998–1999); WKVL (1999–2023); WSMM (2023–2024)

Technical information
- Licensing authority: FCC
- Facility ID: 66618
- Class: D
- Power: 1,000 watts (days only)
- Transmitter coordinates: 35°45′40″N 83°58′56″W
- Translator: 93.7 W229DO (Maryville)

Links
- Public license information: Public file; LMS
- Webcast: Listen live
- Website: www.937wvlz.com

WVLZ (850 AM) is a commercial radio station licensed to Maryville, Tennessee, United States, and serving the Knoxville metropolitan area. It is owned by Loud Media and only operates during the daytime hours.

WVLZ is also heard around the clock on FM translator W229DO (93.7 FM) in Maryville.

== History ==
=== WKVL, WIVK and WUTK (1953–2013) ===
The station signed on the air on March 23, 1953, as WKVL, which stood for its city of license, Knoxville. Over time, it was allowed to boost its power to the maximum for commercial AM stations, 50,000 watts. Because it shared its frequency with KOA in Denver, a Class A station, WKVL could not broadcast after sunset.

In the 1970s, it played country music as WIVK, simulcasting co-owned WIVK-FM. In the mid-1980s, 850 AM was adult contemporary WHIG but later returned to the WIVK simulcast. Then sometime in the late 1980's, Dick Broadcasting, the parent company of WIVK, donated AM 850 to the University of Tennessee. The station call letters were changed to WUTK-AM to serve as a learning lab for students studying broadcast journalism. In between local news segments, the station simulcast the television feed of CNN Headline News. WUTK-AM also carried Cincinnati Reds baseball games.

In 1995, The University of Tennessee sold the station back to Dick Broadcasting as the school could no longer keep up with the operating costs. After Dick Broadcasting took over the station for the second time, they changed the call letters to WIOL "Total Information Radio" airing talk programs such as Dave Ramsey.

In 1999, Dick Broadcasting sold WIOL to Horne Radio Group. The call letters were then changed to WKVL. For the next several years, Horne Radio continued to air talk programming carrying local shows from Walker Johnson, Dewey Warren, Tonya Stout Brown, and Tony Basillio. Also included in the lineup was Neil Boortz and Clark Howard.

On July 2, 2010, the classic country music returned to 850 AM. The station targeted country hits from the 1950s through the 1980s. The local lineup included Bob Lewellyn, Eddie Beacon, Tee Blackman and newcomer Tim Byrd.

=== Blount Media’s ownership (2013–2022) ===
In May 2013, Blount Broadcasting Corporation, owner of WKVL and WLOD, entered into a time brokerage agreement. The deal was made with Oak Ridge FM. The station's Talk format moved from WNOX, which the company had recently sold.

WKVL for a time simulcast with WLOD. On March 31, 2014, WKVL changed formats to classic country.

On December 15, 2014, WKVL went silent. On December 14, 2015, WKVL returned to the air with classic country. On June 1, 2018, WKVL changed formats from classic country to sports radio, branded as "Rocky Top Sports". Effective December 11, 2018, WKVL was given permission to moved its city of license from Knoxville to Maryville. That was combined with a reduction in power from 50,000 watts to 1,000 watts.

=== Loud Media (2022–present) ===
On April 15, 2022, the Blount Broadcasting Corporation announced it had come to an agreement to sell WKVL, its sister station WGAP, and two FM translators to Loud Media. The sale, at a price of $175,000, was consummated on August 17, 2022.

On August 21, 2022, at midnight, WKVL changed formats from sports to variety hits, branded as "Random Music Radio". The first song on “Random Music Radio” was “Mr. Jones” by Counting Crows. On November 24, 2022, WKVL flipped to a simulcast of sister station WPLA, which aired a classic hits format.

On September 20, 2023, WKVL dropped its simulcast with WPLA and began stunting. In addition, Loud Media applied for a new WSMM call sign for the station; the call sign was changed on September 22. It later returned to variety hits with "Random Music Radio" branding. In December, the station began simulcasting on new translator W229DO (93.7 FM), and also began stunting with Christmas music as "Santa 93.7".

On October 21, 2024, WSMM flipped to active rock, branded as "93.7 WVLZ", under new WVLZ call letters. The active rock format and WVLZ call sign moved from 106.1 FM, which flipped to alternative under the WATO call sign.
