= Mary Draper Ingles =

Virginia pioneer kidnapped by Native Americans

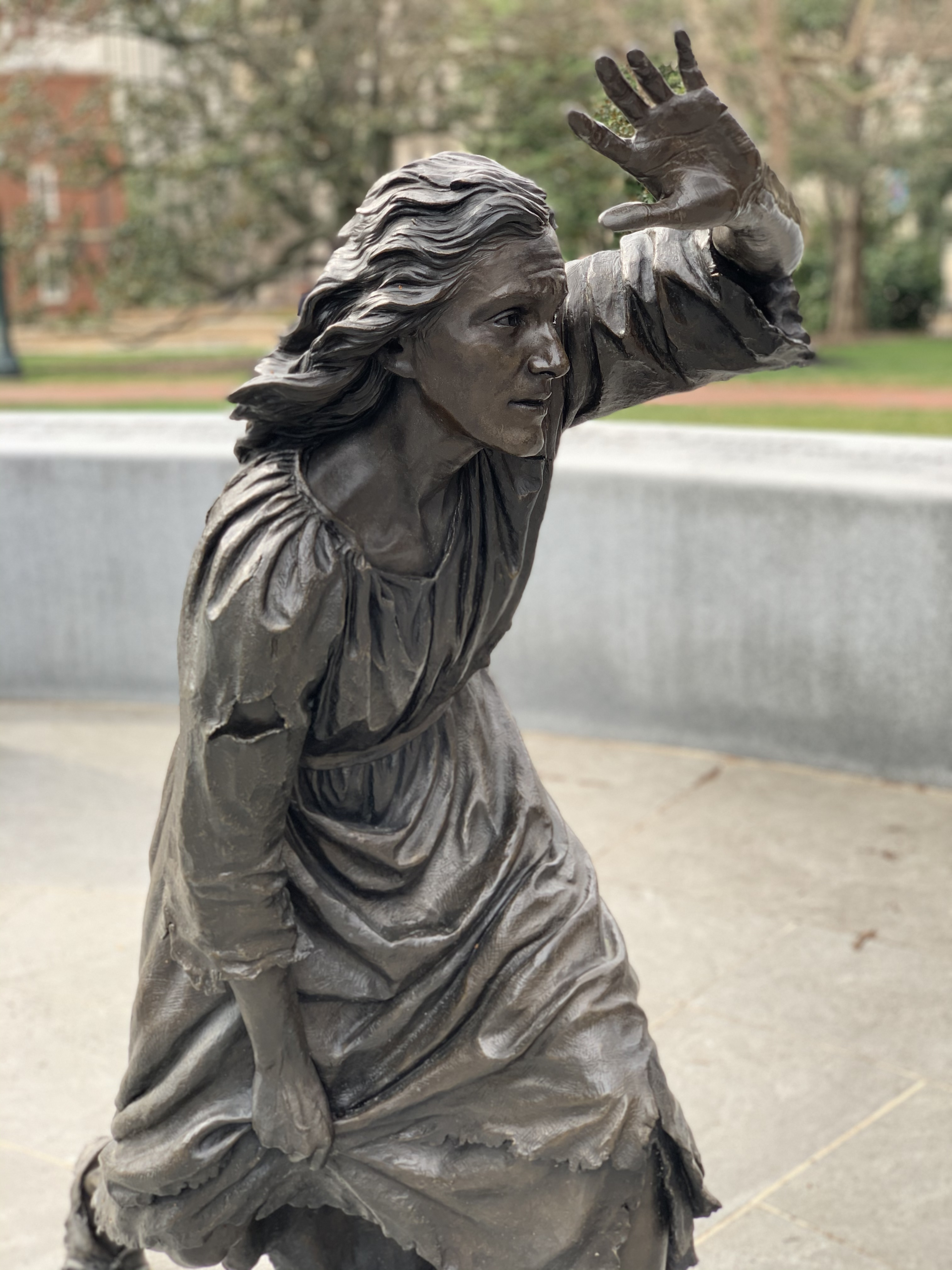
- Statue of Mary Draper Ingles included in the Virginia Women's Monument.
- Born: 1732; Philadelphia, Pennsylvania
- Died: 1 February 1815 (aged 82–83); Ingles Ferry, Virginia, U.S.
- Known for: Escape from Native American captivity in 1755
- Spouse: William Ingles
- Children: Thomas Ingles, George, Mary, Susanna, Rhoda, John
- Parent(s): George and Elenor (Hardin) Draper

Mary Draper Ingles (1732 – February 1815), also known in records as Mary Inglis or Mary English, was an American pioneer and early settler of western Virginia. In the summer of 1755, she and her two young sons were among several captives taken by Shawnee after the Draper's Meadow Massacre during the French and Indian War. They were taken to Lower Shawneetown at the Ohio and Scioto rivers. Ingles escaped with another woman after two and a half months and trekked 500 to 600 miles, crossing numerous rivers, creeks, and the Appalachian Mountains to return home.

Two somewhat different accounts of Mary Draper Ingles' capture and escape, one written by her son John Ingles, and the other by Letitia Preston Floyd, an acquaintance, are the main sources from which the story is known.

The story became well known following the 1855 publication of William Henry Foote's account in Sketches of Virginia: Historical and Biographical, based on Mary's son's manuscript. It was further publicized in 1886 with the publication of an embellished version in John P. Hale's Trans-Allegheny pioneers: historical sketches of the first white settlements west of the Alleghenies.

== Biography ==
=== Early life ===
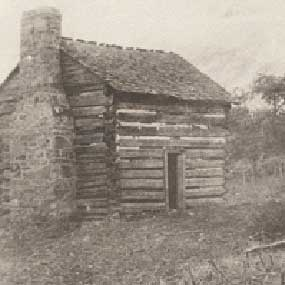
Log cabin next to the New River, near present-day Radford, Virginia, where Mary Draper Ingles and her husband William lived out their lives. Photo c.1890

Mary Draper Ingles was born in 1732 in Philadelphia, Pennsylvania to George and Elenor (Hardin) Draper, who had immigrated to America from County Donegal, Ireland in 1729. Between 1740 and 1744, the Draper family moved to the western frontier of Virginia, settling in Pattonsburg on the James River. According to John P. Hale, in 1744 George Draper went on an exploratory trip into what is now West Virginia, and never returned, although there is evidence that Draper was still alive as late as 1748. By 1746 his family had established Draper's Meadow, a pioneer settlement on the banks of Stroubles Creek near modern-day Blacksburg, Virginia.

In 1750, Mary married fellow settler William Ingles (1729–1782). They had two sons prior to Mary's captivity: Thomas Ingles, born in 1751, and George, in 1753. Three daughters and a son were born to them after Mary's return from captivity.

=== Draper's Meadow massacre ===
On 30 July (or 8 July, according to John P. Hale and Letitia Preston Floyd), 1755, (Note: Evidence supports the 30 July date, as documents confirm that Colonel James Patton, who was killed in the massacre, was in Williamsburg on 8 July. An article in the Virginia Gazette published on 8 August 1755, announced Colonel James Patton's death at Draper's Meadow on "the last day of July." Preston's Register gives the date unequivocally as 30 July.) during the French and Indian War, a band of about sixteen Shawnee warriors (then allies of the French) raided Draper's Meadow and killed at least four settlers, including Colonel James Patton, Mary's mother and Mary's infant niece, and a neighbor named Caspar Barger. They took five captives, including Mary and her two sons, her sister-in-law Bettie Robertson Draper, and her neighbor Henry Lenard (or Leonard). Mary's husband was nearly killed but fled into the forest.

=== Captivity ===
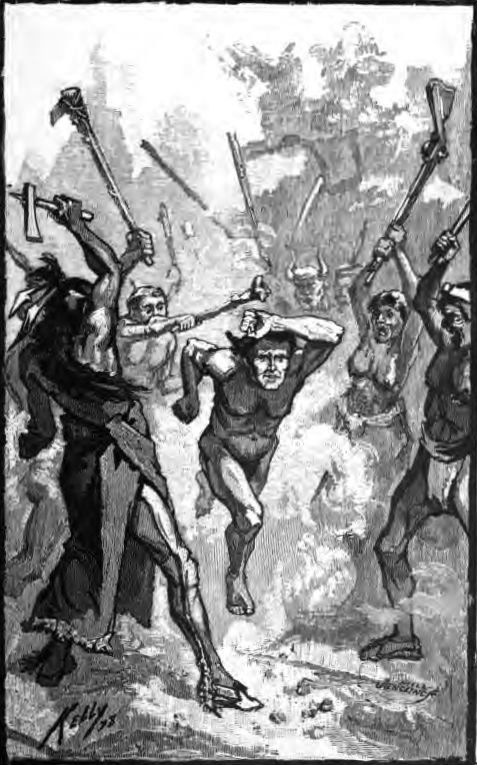
A captive runs the gauntlet between Shawnee warriors.

The Shawnee took their captives, along with several horses loaded with items taken from the settlers' homes, northwest along the New River, then along the Ohio River. They traveled for a month to Lower Shawneetown, located at the confluence of the Scioto and Ohio rivers. Upon arrival at the town, the prisoners were made to undergo the ritual of running the gauntlet:

When their Warriors arrive within half a Mile of their Towns, it is their custom to whip those who have been so unfortunate as to fall into their Hands, all the Remainder of the Way till they get to the Town, and that it was in this Manner our poor unhappy Neighbors from Virginia had been treated by them.

According to her son, Mary was not required to do this. Mary was separated from her sons, who were adopted by Shawnee families. According to John P. Hale, Mary's oldest son Thomas was taken to Detroit, her sister-in-law Bettie was taken to what is now Chillicothe, Ohio, and her youngest son George was taken to an unknown location and died soon afterward. One source states that another captive, Mary's neighbor Henry Leonard, later escaped, although no details are given. An article in the New-York Mercury of 16 February 1756, describing Mary's capture and escape, mentions that while in Lower Shawneetown she saw "a considerable Number of English Prisoners, who have been taken Captives from the Frontiers of Virginia."

Letitia Preston Floyd and other sources state that, about "three months" after being taken prisoner, Mary gave birth to a daughter, although there is evidence to the contrary. As a prisoner, Mary sewed shirts using cloth traded to the Indians by French traders and, at the insistence of the traders, she was paid in goods for her work. The Mercury newspaper account states that Mary was also assigned "to attend [the Native Americans] as Servant, to dress their Victuals, and stretch the Skins they might procure." In October 1755, about three weeks after reaching Lower Shawneetown, she was taken to the Big Bone salt lick to make salt for the Indians by boiling brine.

=== Escape and journey home ===
While working at Big Bone Lick, in late October 1755, Mary persuaded another captive woman, referred to as the "old Dutch woman" but who may have been German, (Note: Jennings (1968) identifies her as a "Mrs. Bingamin", wife of Henry Bingamin, both German immigrants. In his book History of Tazewell County and Southwest Virginia: 1748–1920 (1920) William Cecil Pendleton states that her name was "Frau Stump" and that she had been kidnapped from a settlement near Fort Duquesne. Ed Robey believes that she was the wife of "Dutch Jacob," and was kidnapped during an attack on a New River community on 3 July 1755.) to escape with her. The next day (probably 19 October) they asked permission of the Native Americans to go into the forest to gather wild grapes, and set off, retracing the route their captors had followed after Mary was taken captive in July. They wore moccasins and carried only a tomahawk and a knife (both of which were eventually lost), and two blankets. As they were leaving the camp, they met three French traders from Detroit who were harvesting walnuts. Mary traded her old dull tomahawk for a new one.

The women went north, following the Ohio River as it curves to the east. Expecting pursuit, they tried to hurry at first. As it turned out, the Shawnee made only a brief search, assuming the two women had been "destroyed by wild beasts." The Shawnee told this account to Mary's son Thomas Ingles, when he met some of them many years later after the Battle of Point Pleasant in 1774.

After four or five days the women reached the junction of the Ohio and Scioto rivers, where they could see Lower Shawneetown in the distance, on the opposite riverbank. There they found an abandoned cabin, which contained a supply of corn, and an old horse in the back yard. They took the horse to carry the corn, but he was lost in the river when they tried to take him across what was probably Dutchman's Ripple.

They followed the Ohio, Kanawha, and New rivers, crossing the Licking, Big Sandy, and Little Sandy rivers, Twelvepole Creek, the Guyandotte and Coal rivers, Paint Creek, and the Bluestone River. During their journey, they crossed at least 145 creeks and rivers—remarkable as neither woman could swim. On at least one occasion they "tied logs together with a grape-vine [and] made a raft" to cross a major river. They may have traveled as much as 500 to 600 miles, averaging between eleven and twenty-one miles a day.

Once the corn ran out, they subsisted on black walnuts, wild grapes, pawpaws, sassafras leaves, blackberries, roots and frogs but, as the weather grew cold, they were forced to eat dead animals they found along the way. On several occasions they saw Indians hunting and each time managed to avoid being seen. On one occasion they were able to obtain deer meat from a kill abandoned by an Indian hunter, having

...got very near an Indian before they saw him, but as he was busy in skinning a Deer, he did not see them, till they hid themselves behind a Log, towards which the Indian’s Dog kept a continual barking, which frightened the Indian as well as the Women, and having dispatch’d the skinning of his Deer, with as much speed as possible, he made off, leaving the Carcase behind him, which afterwards afforded an agreeable Repast to the starving Travellers, and after having satiated their Hunger, took as much of the Meat along as they could carry, and pursued their Journey, making the River their Guide, and feeding on Grapes and Nuts for their Support.

By now the temperature had dropped, it was starting to snow, and the two women were weak from starvation. At some point, the old Dutch woman became "very disheartened and discouraged", and tried to kill Mary. (Letitia Preston Floyd's account reports the two women drew lots to decide "which of them was to be eaten by the other.") Mary managed to "keep her in a good humor" by promising "a sum of money" to be paid to her by Mary's father-in-law upon their safe return to Draper's Meadow. Soon after they reached the mouth of the New River, the old Dutch woman made a second attempt on Mary's life, probably about 26 November, but Mary "got loose...and outran her." (The New-York Mercury article states that "the Dutch woman attempted to kill her...in order, as it was supposed, to Eat her; but [Mary] after a fierce struggle, released herself...and fled away.") She hid in the forest and waited until dark, then continued along the riverbank. Finding a canoe, Mary crossed the New River at its junction with the East River near what is now Glen Lyn, Virginia.

Mary continued southeast along the riverbank, passing through the present-day location of Pembroke. Four or five days after leaving the old Dutch woman, she reached a hunting cabin belonging to her friend Adam Harman, on or about 1 December 1755, 42 days after leaving Big Bone Lick. Shortly afterward, a search party went back and found the old Dutch woman. Harman took her to the fort at Dunkard's Bottom, where she joined a wagon party traveling to Winchester, Virginia, with the goal of returning to her home in Pennsylvania.

=== Aftermath ===
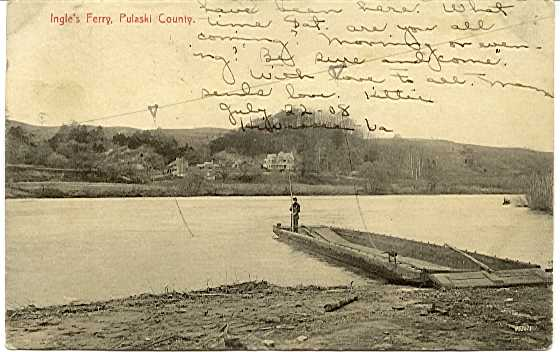
A postcard of Ingles Ferry, ca. 1908

After recovering from her journey and reuniting with her husband, Mary and her husband resumed farming at Dunkard's Bottom until the following spring. Concerned about continued Shawnee raids on neighboring settlements, they moved to Fort Vause, where a small garrison safeguarded the residents. Mary remained uneasy, however, and persuaded her husband to move again, this time to Robert Ewing's Fort near Montvale in Bedford County, Virginia. On the same day that they left, 25 June 1756, Fort Vause was attacked by French troops and a mixed force of 205 Shawnee, Ottawa and Miami Indians. Mary's brother-in-law John was killed, and her brother-in-law Matthew was captured.

Mary very likely provided information about the location, size and layout of Lower Shawneetown to her husband, who then suggested to Lieutenant-Governor Robert Dinwiddie that he organize an assault on the town in retaliation for Shawnee attacks on English settlements. William Ingles participated as a lieutenant in the Sandy Creek Expedition in early 1756, however the expedition was forced to turn back before reaching the town, due to harsh weather and lack of food.

The Ingles had four more children: Mary, Susanna (b. 1759), Rhoda (b. 1762), and John (1766–1836). In 1762, William and Mary established the Ingles Ferry across the New River, and the associated Ingles Ferry Hill Tavern and blacksmith shop. She died there in 1815, aged 83. The site of her former log cabin, with a stable and a family cemetery, is protected as part of the Ingles Bottom Archeological Sites.

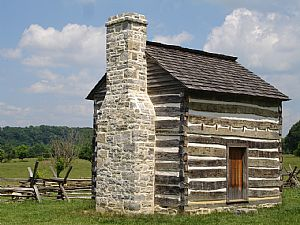
A reconstruction of Mary Draper Ingles' home at Ingles Ferry, built on the foundations of her original home.

Mary's son George probably died in Indian captivity, but Thomas Ingles, who was 4 when taken captive, was ransomed and returned to Virginia in 1768 at the age of 17; after 13 years with the Shawnee, he had become fully acculturated and spoke only Shawnee. He underwent several years of "rehabilitation" and education under Dr. Thomas Walker at Castle Hill, Virginia.

Thomas Ingles later served as a lieutenant under Colonel William Christian in Lord Dunmore's War (1773–1774) against the Shawnee. He married Eleanore Grills in 1775 and settled in Burke's Garden, Virginia. In 1782, his wife and three children were kidnapped by Indians. Thomas came to rescue them and in the ensuing altercation, the two older children were killed. Eleanore was tomahawked but survived. Thomas rescued her and their youngest daughter.

In 1761, Mary Ingles' brother John Draper attended a gathering of Cherokee chiefs at which a treaty to end the Anglo-Cherokee War was prepared. He found a man who knew of his wife, Bettie Robertson Draper, who had been taken captive in 1755. At that time, she was living at Chillicothe with the family of a widowed Cherokee chief. She was ransomed, and John took her to New River Valley.

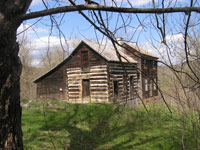
A reconstruction of the Ingles Ferry Tavern near Radford, Virginia.

On 8 May 1779, Lord Henry Hamilton, a British prisoner of war, was being escorted under guard to Williamsburg and spent the night at the home of William and Mary Ingles. In his journal, Hamilton noted that the trauma of Mary's captivity and escape still affected her, 24 years later:

8th. In the Evening crossed over in a ferry the new river or great Canhawa, and were kindly and hospitably received at the house of Colonel Ingles-- here we rested for an entire day...Mrs. Ingles had in her early years been carryed off with another young Woman by the Savages, and tho carryed away into the Shawanes country had made her escape with her female friend, & wonderful to relate tho exposed to unspeakable hardships, & having nothing to subsist on but wild fruits, found her way back in safety, from a distance (if I remember right) of 200 miles-- however terror and distress had left so deep an impression on her mind that she appear'd absorbed in a deep melancholy, and left the management of household concerns, & the reception of Strangers to her lovely daughter.

== Historical accounts of Mary Draper Ingles' journey ==
The only primary source of information about Mary Ingles' capture and escape is an article published in the New York Mercury on 16 February 1756 based on a report from "a Traveller who lately came from New River in Virginia," which contains a few details not found elsewhere. Her escape journey is also referred to briefly in two other Mercury articles, on 26 January and 1 March.

An important secondary source is the 1824 written account by Colonel John Ingles, son of Mary Ingles and William Ingles, born in 1766 after Mary's return. His account, The Story of Mary Draper Ingles and Son Thomas Ingles, written when he was 58, is based on stories he had heard from his parents. This is probably the most significant document describing Mary Ingles' capture and escape. (Note: The original manuscript is at the Albert and Shirley Small Special Collection in the University of Virginia library. It is very difficult to read, with little punctuation and poor spelling. It has been reproduced in an edition by Roberta Ingles Steele which retains the eccentricities of the author; copies are available at the Radford Public Library.)

=== Letitia Preston Floyd ===
Another significant secondary source is an 1843 letter by Letitia Preston Floyd (1779–1852, wife of Virginia Governor John Floyd and daughter of Colonel William Preston, himself a survivor of the Draper's Meadow massacre) to her son Benjamin Rush Floyd. Letitia Preston Floyd did not know Mary Draper Ingles personally, although she claimed to have seen her once, in 1811 or 1812 at "a large Baptist Association." She reports information that she learned from other sources, about Ingles' capture and escape. Historian Preston Davie described this letter as "replete with errors...A jumble of inaccurate hearsay and fact...more imaginative than real." Glanville and Mays counter this opinion: "The overall accuracy of Mrs. Floyd’s 'My Dear Rush' letter is surprisingly good...She made minor errors in dates and places. However, it seems to us that Mrs. Floyd did remarkably well for a person aged 63 who was often writing of events about which she learned four or five decades earlier."

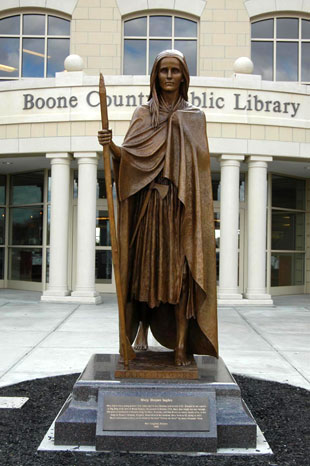
Boone County Library statue of Mary Draper Ingles

Differences between the narratives of John Ingles and Letitia Preston Floyd suggest that the Ingles and Preston families had developed distinct oral traditions. They differ on the date of the massacre (July 30 vs July 8, according to Ingles and Floyd, respectively), the number of casualties, the ages of Mary Ingles' children, and several other aspects.

John Peter Hale, one of Mary Ingles' great-grandsons, claimed to have interviewed Letitia Preston Floyd, and other people who knew Mary Ingles personally. His 1886 narrative contains numerous details not cited in any previous account. There were some references to Mary Ingles' escape in contemporary reports and letters, which were gathered in later efforts to document people who had been taken captive by Indians.

== In popular culture ==
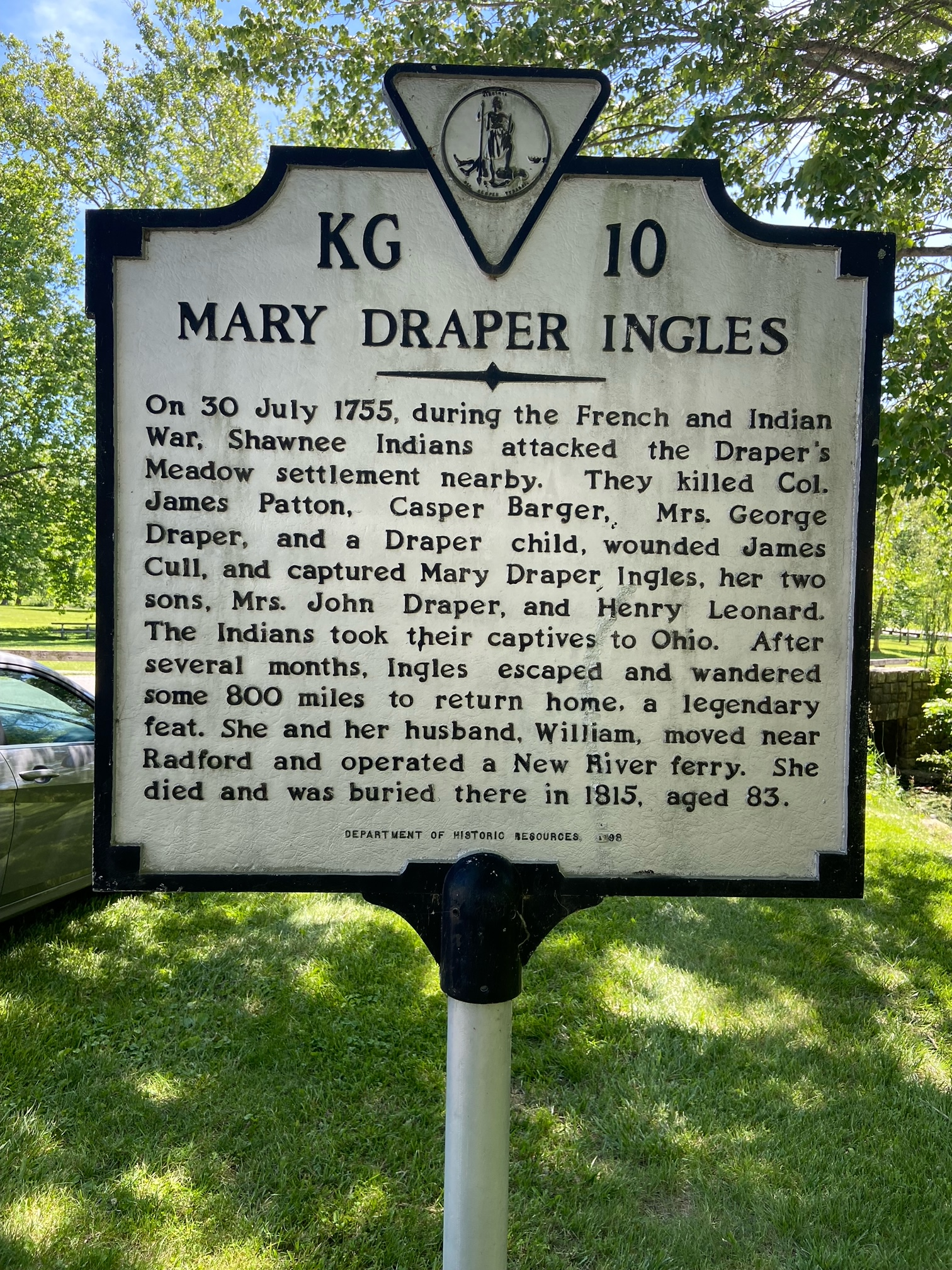
Mary Draper Ingles Historical marker on Virginia Tech campus.

The story of Ingles' ordeal has inspired a number of books and films, including:

- Thom, James Alexander (1981). Follow the River. A novel.
- Follow the River (1995). A television movie adaptation of the novel produced by ABC, starring Sheryl Lee.
- The Captives (2004), a film based on these events.
- The Long Way Home, an outdoor historical drama produced each summer from 1971 to 1999, at the Ingles homestead, relating the history of Mary Draper Ingles and her family. The General Assembly identified it as the "official" outdoor drama. While it attracted thousands to the city, the production was finally closed. (Since 2010, other efforts have been made to develop aspects of tourism heritage related to the Ingles history.)

== Memorialization ==
- On October 14, 2019, the Virginia Women's Monument Commission dedicated seven statues, including one of Mary Draper Ingles. The other six statues are of Anne Burras Laydon, Cockacoeske, Elizabeth Keckly, Laura Copenhaver, Virginia Randolph, and Adele Clark. The monument is sited on Capitol Square grounds in Richmond, Virginia.
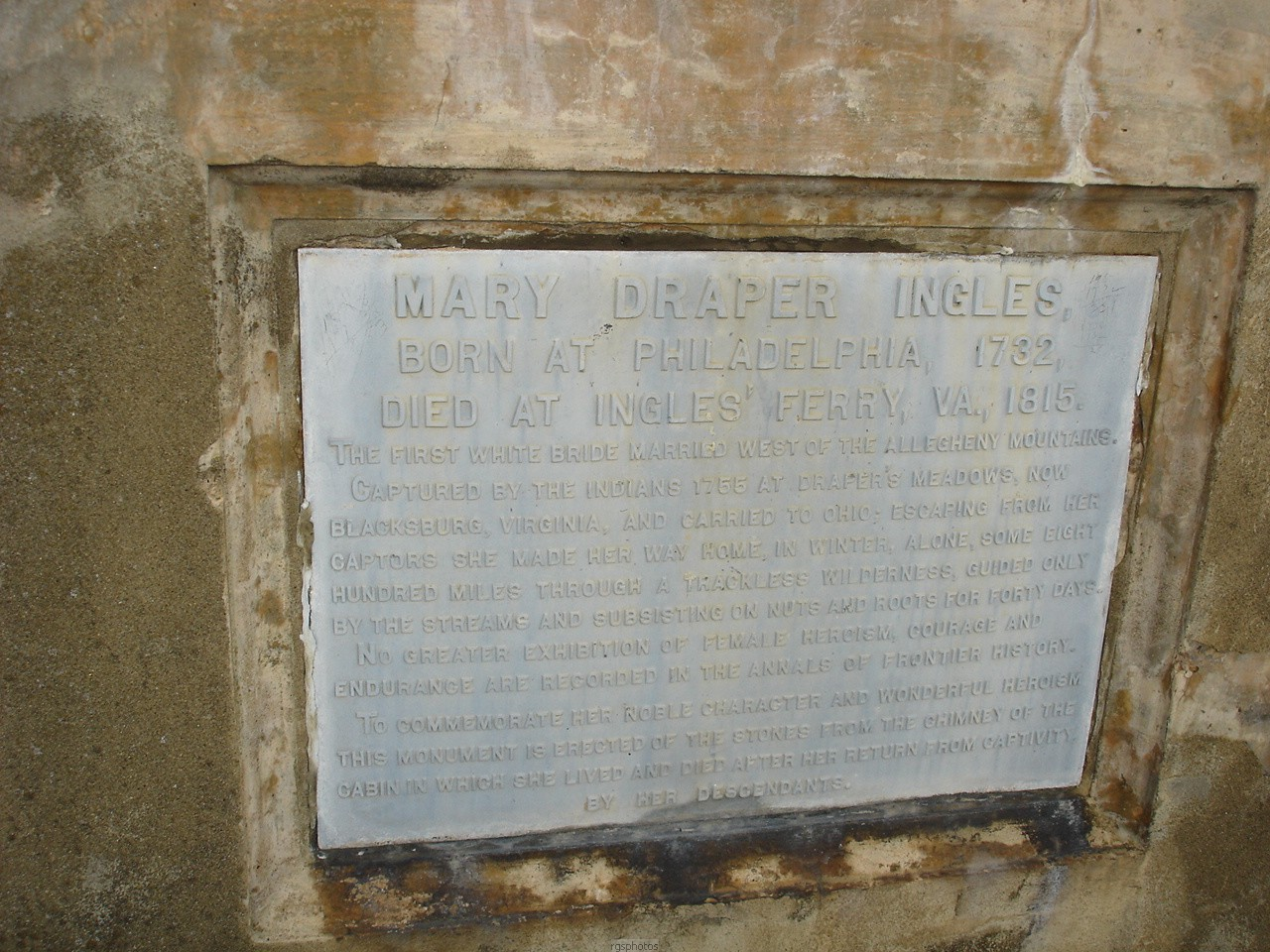
  Plaque on the chimney stone memorial of Mary Draper Ingles in the West End Cemetery in Radford, VA.
- Radford University, located near Draper's Meadow, has residence halls named Draper Hall and Ingles Hall in honor of Mary Draper Ingles.
- A statue of Mary Ingles, identical to the one in front of the Boone County Public Library, was unveiled in the Radford Cultural Heritage Park near the Glencoe Museum in October, 2016.

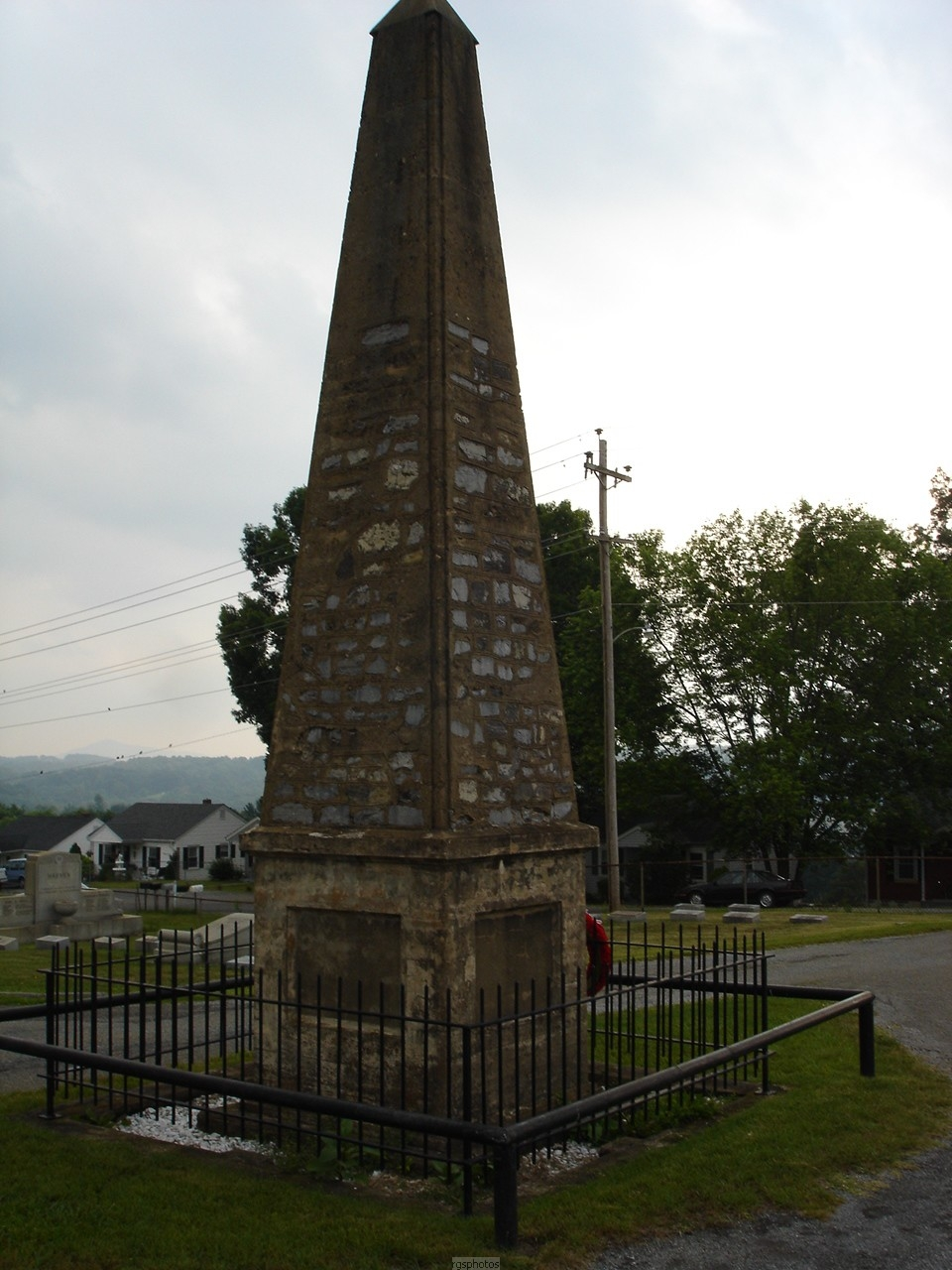
Monument of chimney stones in Radford's West End Cemetery

- A monument dedicated to Mary Draper Ingles is located in West End Cemetery, Radford, Virginia. It was built using stones from the chimney of a home where Ingles lived after her return in 1755.
- Mary Ingles Elementary School in Tad, West Virginia is named for her.
- An 8-foot-tall (2.4 m) bronze statue depicting Mary Draper Ingles was installed outside the Boone County Public Library on route 18 in Burlington, Kentucky.
- Kentucky Route 8 in Campbell, Bracken, and Mason counties is officially named "Mary Ingles Highway."
- Ingles Ferry was listed on the National Register of Historic Places in 1969, and the Ingles Bottom Archeological Sites in 1978.
- The Virginia Tech library holds documents once owned by Mary Draper Ingles.
- The Mary Draper Ingles Bridge crosses the New River and is located in Summers County, West Virginia.
- Mary Draper Ingles Cultural Heritage Park, adjacent to the Radford Visitors' Center, includes a bronze statue cast from the same mold as the one at the Boone County Public Library in Burlington, Kentucky.
- The Mary Ingles Chapter of the National Society Daughters of the American Revolution is located in Fort Thomas, Kentucky.

== See also ==
- William Ingles
- Thomas Ingles
- Draper's Meadow massacre
- James Patton (Virginia colonist)
- Lower Shawneetown
