= William Ingles =

Virginia colonial soldier (1729–1782)

- Born: 1729; Dublin, Ireland
- Died: 1782 (aged 52–53); Ingles Ferry, Virginia, U.S.
- Occupations: Farmer, ferry operator
- Spouse: Mary Draper Ingles
- Children: Thomas Ingles, George, Mary, Susanna, Rhoda, John
- Father: Thomas Inglis
- Relatives: Matthew (brother), John (brother)
- Military service
- Allegiance: Colony of Virginia
- Service years: 1756, 1763–1782
- Rank: Colonel
- Unit: Virginia Regiment
- Conflicts: French and Indian War; Sandy Creek Expedition; Lord Dunmore's War; Battle of Point Pleasant

William Ingles (1729 – September, 1782), also spelled Inglis, Ingliss, Engels, or English, was a colonist and soldier in colonial Virginia. He participated in the Sandy Creek Expedition and was a signatory of the Fincastle Resolutions. He was eventually promoted to colonel in the Virginia Regiment. His wife, Mary Draper Ingles, was captured by Shawnee warriors and held captive for months before escaping and walking several hundred miles to her settlement. William's sons, Thomas and George, were also held captive, although William was able to ransom his son Thomas in 1768. William Ingles established Ingles Ferry in southwestern Virginia.

== Birth, family and early life ==
William Ingles was born in Dublin, Ireland (some sources say London, England) in 1729, to Thomas Inglis. Historian John P. Hale, a descendant, reports that William had two brothers, Matthew and John. John was killed by Indians at Fort Vause in 1756. One source says that Matthew eventually became a sailor, never married and died at sea, while Matthew's nephew John Ingles wrote that, after escaping from Indian captivity, he died at Ingles Ferry.

William's father Thomas was a wealthy merchant who owned a large, importing wholesale business and traded abroad with his own ships. He was born and raised in London and lived in Dublin between 1730 and 1740. Records show that Thomas and his sons were apparently imprisoned after a political dispute, but by the fall of 1744 all of them had crossed the Atlantic and journeyed to Augusta County, Virginia. Thomas's brothers John and William came with him to Virginia.

In November, 1746, "Thomas English" and "William English" are listed as members of a road construction crew in Augusta County, on the road "from the Ridge above Tobias Bright’s that parts the waters of New River from the branches of Roan Oak to the lower ford of Catabo Creek." In 1749, William Ingles went to Burke's Garden to build a house with his uncle, John Ingles. On 16 March 1750, Ingles' home was visited by Dr. Thomas Walker at the very start of Walker's trip west into what is now Kentucky. Walker wrote in his journal: "16th March 1750. We kept up...to William Englishes (Ingles). He lives on a small Branch and was not much hurt by the Fresh (spring floods)." In March, 1753, Thomas Ingles and his son William were listed in the Augusta County court records as workers on a road construction crew.

== Draper's Meadow massacre, 1755 ==
William Ingles was among the founders of Draper's Meadow (present day Blacksburg, Virginia) in 1748. The Ingles and the Draper families established the settlement with Colonel James Patton. William built and operated Ingles Mill, one of the first mills in western Virginia, at Draper's Meadow in 1750, when he was only 21 years old. He married Mary Draper in 1750, and their two sons Thomas and George were born in 1751 and 1753. In February, 1754, William purchased 255 acres from James Patton.

On 30 July (or 8 July, according to John P. Hale and Letitia Preston Floyd (Note: Evidence supports the July 30 date, as documents confirm that Colonel James Patton, who was killed in the massacre, was in Williamsburg on July 8. An article in the Virginia Gazette published on 8 August 1755, announced Colonel James Patton's death at Draper's Meadow on "the last day of July." Preston's Register gives the date unequivocally as 30 July.)) 1755, Shawnee warriors attacked Drapers Meadow, killing Eleanor Draper and her granddaughter, as well as Colonel James Patton and another neighbor, Caspar Barger. Shawnee warriors captured Mary as well as her two sons, Betty Draper, and a neighbor, Henry Leonard. William Ingles and John Draper were harvesting wheat in the fields until they saw the smoke from the burning cabins, but they arrived too late to help. William was pursued by Indians, but tripped and fell in the forest, and the Shawnee warriors ran past him without seeing him.

== Sandy Creek Expedition, 1756 ==
William and John Ingles traveled to Williamsburg to try and persuade the government to launch an attack on Shawnee villages in southern Ohio, where they believed that Mary Draper Ingles was being held prisoner. They returned unsuccessful in late November, when they learned that Mary had escaped and had walked 500 to 600 miles, crossing numerous rivers, creeks, and the Appalachian Mountains to return home. William Ingles then went back to Williamsburg to try to convince Governor Robert Dinwiddie to order an attack on the Shawnee. Dinwiddie and Colonel George Washington, then commander of the Virginia Regiment, used information provided by Mary Ingles to plan an attack on Lower Shawneetown, a community where Mary Ingles was held captive for about two weeks. It was hoped that this would intimidate the Shawnee and prevent further attacks on English settlements.

In February, 1756, William Ingles joined a force of 220 militia and 130 Cherokee warriors as a lieutenant on the Sandy Creek Expedition to attack Lower Shawneetown in Ohio. On 13 March they were forced to turn back due to bad weather and lack of food. The expedition was a total failure, but it provided valuable experience for William and launched his military career.

== Attack on Fort Vause, 1756 ==
William and Mary left their homestead in Draper's Meadow and moved to Fort Vause in June 1756, but Mary persuaded her husband to move again, this time to Robert Ewing's Fort near the Peaks of Otter, close to present day Montvale, Virginia. On 25 June, the same day that William and Mary left Fort Vause, 25 French soldiers and 205 Miami, Ottawa and Shawnee warriors under the command of François-Marie Picoté de Belestre attacked the fort. William's brother John Ingles is credited with shooting a scout from a tree, and then sounding the alarm that the fort was about to be attacked. He was killed and his wife Mary and their children were taken prisoner. William's brother Matthew Ingles fought hand-to-hand until his rifle broke, then with a frying pan handle, killing two of his attackers. He was taken prisoner by the Shawnee, but years later was released or escaped. He died at Ingles Ferry, "a few months after his return."

== Rescue of Thomas Ingles ==
William and Mary lived briefly in Bedford County, Virginia, before moving to a site on the New River where in 1756, William purchased 900 acres of land that had been part of the German Schwarzenau Brethren community known as Dunkard's Bottom, Virginia. He and Mary established a farm and assisted in the construction of a small fort there, probably no more than a blockhouse, which was later named Fort Frederick. They had four more children: Mary, Susanna (b. 1759), Rhoda (b. 1762), and John (1766-1836). In 1773 they sold their Draper's Meadow property to William Preston.

William made several trips to Ohio to negotiate for the release of his sons George and Thomas, still in captivity among the Shawnee. George's whereabouts were never determined, and he is believed to have died in captivity. One source reports that William met a man named Baker who had been held captive by the Shawnee at Lower Shawneetown, and had known Thomas and his adoptive father. William hired Baker to find Thomas (now living on the upper Scioto River) and bring him back to Ingles Ferry. Baker was able to pay a ransom of $150 and bring Thomas back to Bedford County, but Thomas ran away and returned to his Shawnee family. In 1768, William Ingles and Baker traveled together to Lower Shawneetown and persuaded Thomas, now 17, to return with them to Virginia. After thirteen years among the Shawnee, Thomas had become fully acculturated and spoke only Shawnee, so William sent him for several years of "rehabilitation" and education under Dr. Thomas Walker at Castle Hill, Virginia.

Thomas Ingles later served as a lieutenant under Colonel William Christian in Lord Dunmore's War (1773-1774) against the Shawnee. He married Eleanore Grills in 1775 and settled in Burke's Garden, Virginia. In 1782, his wife and three children were kidnapped by Indians. Thomas came to rescue them and in the ensuing altercation, the two older children were killed. Eleanore was tomahawked but survived. Thomas rescued her and their youngest daughter.

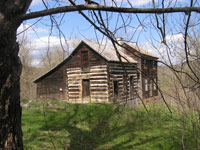
The original Ingles Ferry Tavern, still standing near Radford, Virginia

== Ingles Ferry ==
As early as 1760, William Ingles was making money ferrying troops across the New River during the Anglo-Cherokee War. In 1762 he established Ingles Ferry, and, realizing the value of the ferry, purchased the land from Dr. Thomas Walker. During the first few years of its existence, Indians frequently attacked the farm and ferry, and Ingles constructed a small stockaded blockhouse, which he named Fort Hope, to protect his family and neighbors. In 1766 he applied for a license to operate an ordinary (tavern) there. Construction of the Ingles Ferry Hill Tavern and blacksmith shop on the Pulaski County side of the river was completed in 1772. Ingles was in charge of improving and maintaining the road leading to and from Ingles Ferry, known at the time as Ingles Ferry Road or English Ferry Road. It later became a main thoroughfare and was part of as the Great Wagon Road and the Wilderness Road. By 1780, William Ingles owned 907 acres, 67 cattle, and ten slaves, who ran his ferry, worked in his mills or in domestic capacities. The 1782 Montgomery County, Virginia Personal Property Tax List shows that he was assessed for taxes on 10 slaves, 51 horses and 67 cattle.

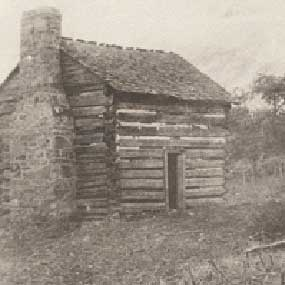
Log cabin next to the New River, near present-day Radford, Virginia, where William Ingles and his wife Mary lived out their lives. Photo c.1890

On 8 May 1779, Lord Henry Hamilton, a British prisoner of war, was being escorted under guard to Williamsburg and spent the night at the home of William and Mary Ingles. In his journal, Hamilton described the Ingles' home:

8th. In the Evening crossed over in a ferry the new river or great Canhawa, and were kindly and hospitably received at the house of Colonel Ingles-- here we rested for an entire day...The Scenery about this house was romantic to a degree, the river very beautyfull, the hills well wooded, the low grounds well improved & well stocked, I thought...Mrs. Ingles had in her early years been carryed off with another young Woman by the Savages...however terror and distress had left so deep an impression on her mind that she appear'd absorbed in a deep melancholy, and left the management of household concerns, & the reception of Strangers to her lovely daughter.

Following William Ingles' death in 1782, his son Thomas Ingles took over the operation of Ingles Ferry.

== Legal roles ==
William Ingles was appointed constable in 1750 and judge for Augusta County in 1769. He was a county sheriff in 1773, and served as a judge for Fincastle County, Virginia, in 1777. He presided over the first Fincastle County court, held at the Lead Mines (now Austinville, Virginia) on 6 January 1778.

== Military career ==
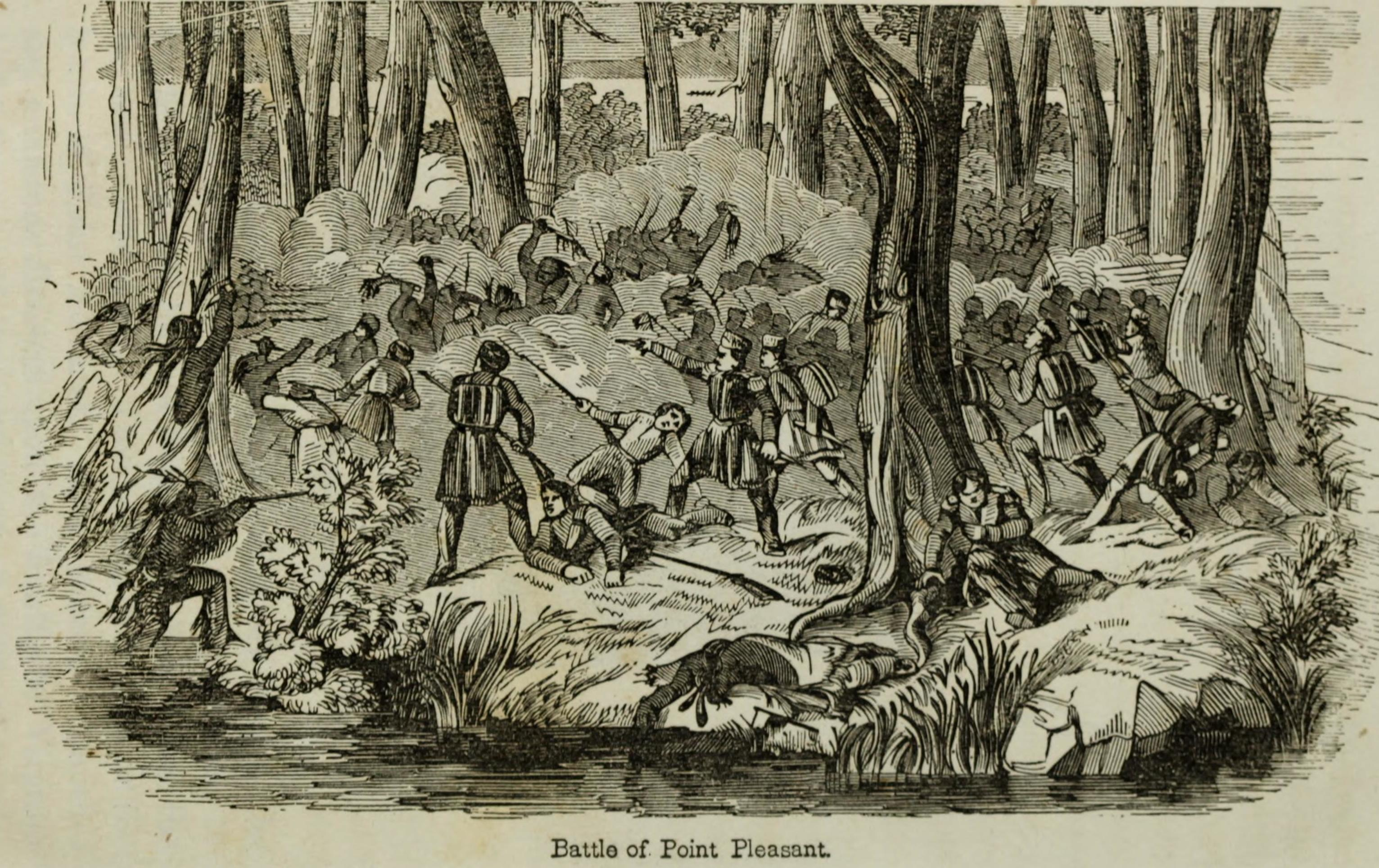
Woodcut showing the Battle of Point Pleasant

In 1760, Ingles was at Ingles Ferry when he was informed that a party of eight or ten Indians who had raided settlements in Bedford and Halifax were camped six miles away, with several women and children prisoners and horses loaded with stolen goods. Ingles assembled a group of sixteen or eighteen men and attacked the Indians' camp at dawn, killing seven of them, retrieving the goods and rescuing the captives.

Ingles served in the Virginia Militia and commanded a unit of Virginia Rangers in 1763. On 13 September he reported to his commanding officer, William Preston, about a skirmish between Indians and his militiamen, who "all behaved like good soldiers." Several Indians were killed and the colonists captured thirty horses. Ingles sent Preston a shot pouch taken from one of the Indians as a "small trophee of our Victory." Ingles requested permission to continue serving at Fort Hope, even though powder and shot were in short supply. In October 1763, Ingles was called to pursue a group of fifty (probably Shawnee) warriors who had attacked settlements at Roanoke and Catawba and were heading back to Ohio with three prisoners. Ingles' company of twenty men attacked them and killed several of the warriors before the Indians fled, abandoning their captives.

On 10 October 1774, Ingles and his son Thomas participated in the Battle of Point Pleasant, William as a major and commissary under Colonel William Fleming, Thomas as a lieutenant under Colonel William Christian. On 6 October, William Ingles was setting up camp, and wrote jokingly to Preston that, as they had not seen any of the enemy, "we encamped on the forks of the river and looked on our Selves in Safe Possession of a fine Encampment and thought our Selves a terror to all the Indian Tribes on the Ohio and thus Luld in safety." On the battlefield, Ingles admired the courage of the Indians who "disputed the Ground with the Greatest Obstinancy, often Runing up to the Very Muzels of our Guns." He recalled seeing "many a brave fellow Waltirring in his Gore," and reported after the battle that they scalped twenty Indians on the field. In 1777 he was made colonel of the militia in Montgomery County, Virginia,

== Fincastle Resolutions, 1775 ==
On January 20, 1775, William Ingles was one of the 15 signatories of the Fincastle Resolutions, addressed to Virginia's delegation at the First Continental Congress, which expressed support for Congress's resistance to the Intolerable Acts, issued in 1774 by the British Parliament.

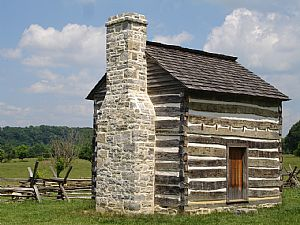
A reconstruction of William Ingles' home at Ingles Ferry, built on the foundations of his original home

== Land dispute ==
For many years Ingles attempted to patent his claim to his lands along the New River, the Holston River in Burke's Garden, Virginia, and along the Bluestone River, but he had great difficulty obtaining ownership rights. He did obtain patents for 1000 acres in Abbs Valley in 1774 and for 1000 acres on the Elkhorn Creek in 1780.

In 1781, Ingles filed a lawsuit claiming that surveys conducted by Patton's son-in-law John Buchanan were illegal, as Buchanan was not licensed by the College of William and Mary, which conducted licensing examinations to certify surveyors. Buchanan's surveys of Ingles' lands would have been rendered null and void if it was revealed that he was unlicensed. Comparisons of Buchanan's and Preston's survey measurements with modern-day measurements show that both Preston and Buchanan underreported the acreage that they surveyed for James Patton, in order to reduce the amount of quitrent Patton owed. It seems likely that Buchanan and Preston used a fraudulent Gunter's chain that was forty percent longer than the legally standardized chain, in order to complete their surveys. The same year, Ingles submitted a petition to the state legislature complaining about the surveying and land speculation practices of his former friend and military comrade William Preston. The lawsuit was as yet unsettled by the date of Ingles' death in 1782.

Other patents were approved in the months following Ingles' death. His son-in-law, Abram Trigg, supported Ingles' claims and fought a lengthy legal battle on his behalf.

== Trial, 1780 ==
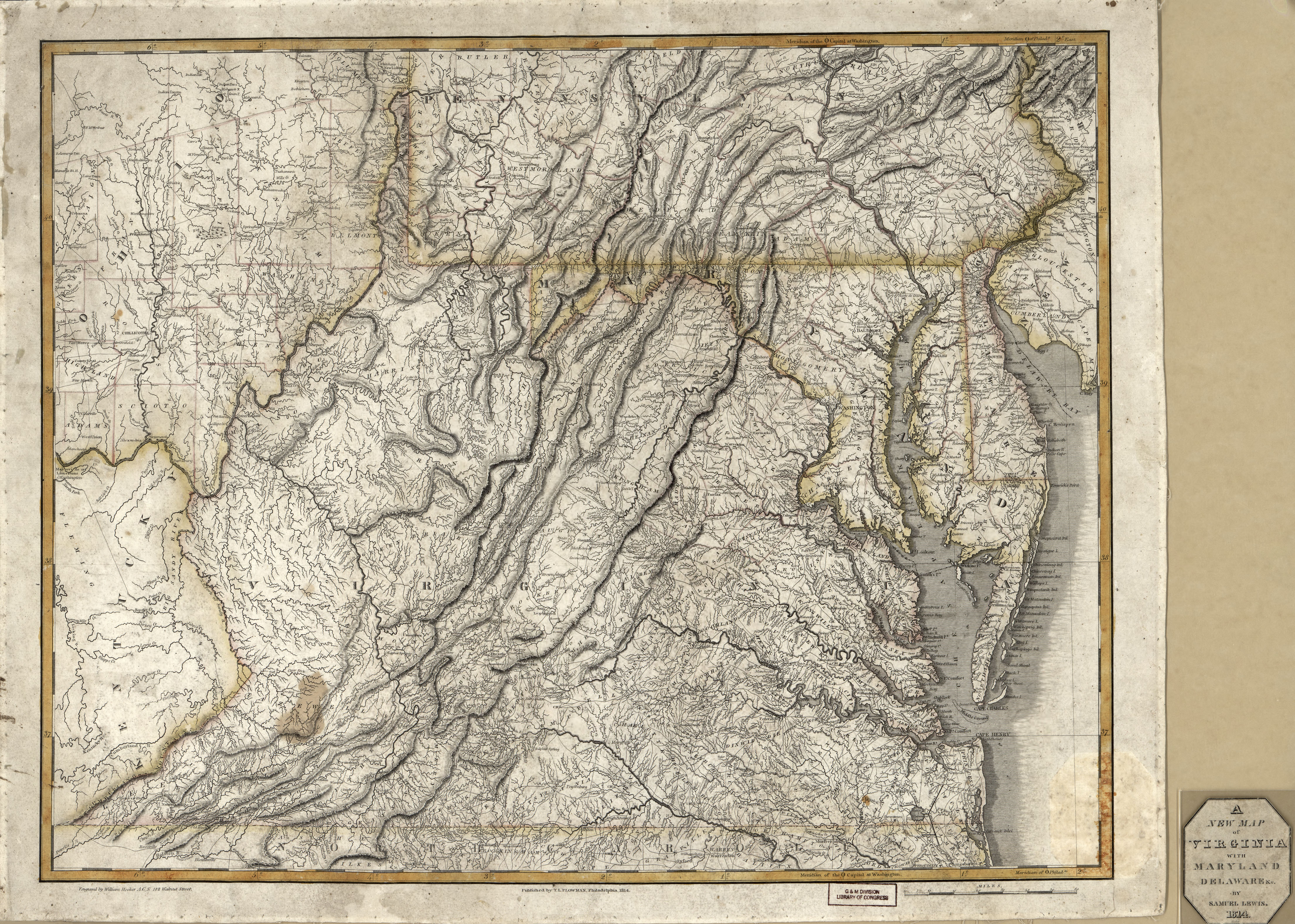
1814 map of Virginia showing "Inglish Fer[ry]" in the lower left quadrant.

In August and September, 1780, 55 men were brought to trial over their alleged Loyalist activities. William Ingles was accused of being one of the leaders of a Tory plot. A committee headed by Ingles' friend William Preston found most of the accused men guilty. Some were imprisoned in the Augusta County Jail or had their property confiscated, and a few were whipped. Preston ordered many of them to pay fines of £100 or join the Continental Army. William Ingles was charged with treason and ordered to put up a bond of £100,000, a massive sum of money for that time. It is unknown if Ingles actually put up a bond or not, but he was not convicted. Soon after this, he resigned from the military, citing "physical infirmity".

== Death, 1782 ==
William Ingles died in 1782 (after the date of his will, 5 September) at age 53. Records indicate that he bequeathed some of his land to his youngest daughter, Rhoda, some to his daughter Susanna and her husband, Abram Trigg, and some to Abram's brother Daniel Trigg. Another portion went to Colonel William Christian, executor of Ingles' estate. A copy of his will found at the Virginia Probate Archives dictates: "Son Thomas a tract of land 1000 [acres] on the Blue Stone, known by the name of Absolem's Valley, and a slave." Ingles willed the Ingles Ferry, including land on both sides of the New River, to his son John Ingles.

William Ingles is buried in the Westview Cemetery, Radford, Virginia.

== Memorialization ==
Ingles Ferry was listed on the National Register of Historic Places in 1969, and the Ingles Bottom Archeological Sites in 1978. The original Ingles Ferry Tavern and a reconstruction of the Ingles home where William ingles died, with a stable and a family cemetery, can be seen at the Ingles Ferry historic Site in Pulaski County, Virginia.

== See also ==
- Ingles Ferry
- Mary Draper Ingles
- Thomas Ingles
- Draper's Meadow massacre
- Battle of Point Pleasant
- Sandy Creek Expedition
- William Preston (Virginia soldier)
