= Draper's Meadow massacre =

1755 attack by Shawnee warriors on a Virginia pioneer settlement

Draper's Meadow Massacre
- Part of French and Indian War
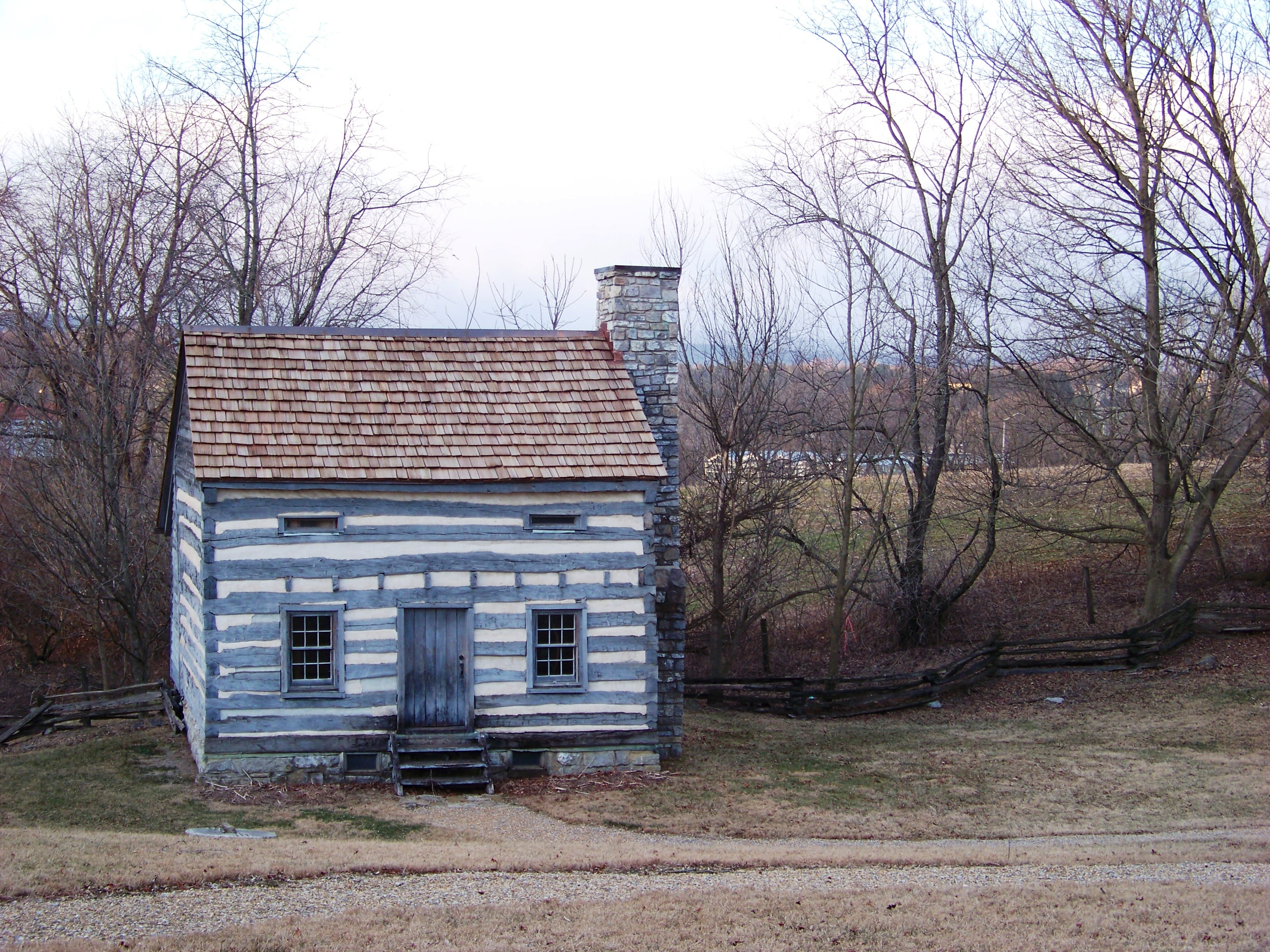
- Reconstructed 18th-century pioneer cabin on Smithfield Plantation, near the site of the Draper's Meadow Massacre in Blacksburg, Virginia.

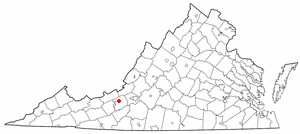
- Location of Draper's Meadow settlement in 1755
- Location: 37°22′59″N 80°42′59″W; Draper's Meadow, Virginia
- Date: July 8 or 30, 1755
- Attack type: Mass murder
- Deaths: 4 killed
- Injuries: 2 wounded
- Victim: European settlers
- Assailant: 16 Shawnee warriors

The Draper's Meadow Massacre was an attack in July 1755, when the Draper's Meadow settlement in southwest Virginia, at the site of present-day Blacksburg, was raided by a group of Shawnee warriors, who killed at least four people including an infant, and captured five more. The Indians brought their hostages to Lower Shawneetown, a Shawnee village in Kentucky. One of the captives, Mary Draper Ingles, later escaped and returned home on foot through the wilderness. Although many of the circumstances of the massacre are uncertain, including the date of the attack, the event remains a dramatic story in the history of Virginia.

== Location ==
The original 7,500 acre (30 km^{2}) tract that became known as Draper's Meadow was awarded on 20 June 1753 to Colonel James Patton, an Irish sea captain turned land speculator, by Governor Robert Dinwiddie. This land was bordered by Tom's Creek on the north, Stroubles Creek on the south and the Mississippi watershed (modern-day U.S. Route 460) on the east; it approached the New River on the west. In early 1754 Patton sold 17 subdivisions to 18 settlers, including John Draper and William Ingles, although the Drapers had established a homestead on the land as early as 1746, and William Ingles had started farming in the area after marrying Mary Draper Ingles in 1750. The settlement was situated on the present-day campus of Virginia Tech in Blacksburg, Virginia. At the time of the attack, the area had been populated by a group of around twenty settlers who were a mix of migrants from Pennsylvania of Irish and Germanic origin, some of whom were landowners and others tenant farmers. A marker commemorating the massacre is located near the Duck Pond on the Virginia Tech campus.

== Massacre ==
Rising tensions between the natives and western settlers were exacerbated by fighting in the French and Indian War and the encroachment on tribal hunting grounds. Recent victories by the French over the British, although north of Virginia, had left much of the frontier unprotected. In the summer of 1755 several settlements had been ravaged by the Indians. On 9 July a force of about 1300 British soldiers under the command of General Edward Braddock had been decisively defeated by French troops and Shawnees at the Battle of the Monongahela, which encouraged further violence against settlers in the region.

On Wednesday, 30 July (see below regarding disagreement of sources about the date) a group of Shawnee (then allies of the French) entered the sparsely populated settlement. One source says there were sixteen Shawnee warriors. They killed at least four people, wounded at least two persons and set fire to the cabins. Among the dead were Colonel James Patton, Caspar Barger, and two people in Mary Draper Ingles' family: her mother (Eleanor Draper), and her sister-in-law Bettie Robertson Draper's infant daughter, who was killed by dashing her head against the wall of a cabin. In an account of the massacre written in 1843, Letitia Preston Floyd, a descendant of one of the massacre's survivors, claimed that two other children were killed, but there is no additional evidence to support this. Bettie Draper was shot through the arm and a man named James Cull was wounded in his foot during the attack. William Preston (Colonel Patton's nephew) and John Draper (Bettie Draper's husband, Mary's brother) were not at the settlement at the time of the attack, and survived. William Ingles (Mary's husband) was attacked and nearly killed but managed to flee into the forest.

One of the victims, Phillip Barger, described by Letitia Preston Floyd as "a very old man", was decapitated by the Indians, who delivered his head in a bag to the Lybrook home at Sinking Creek, telling Mrs. Lybrook that "they had killed two men one woman and three children," and "to look in the bag and she would see an old friend." (Note: There is no record of a Phillip Barger at Draper's Meadow or nearby Sinking Creek, so this is commonly assumed to be Caspar Barger, a German immigrant who is known to have been killed during the massacre. Phillip Barger may have been his son. Caspar's birth date is recorded as 1708, however, making him only 47 or 48.) Five settlers were captured and taken back to Lower Shawneetown in Ohio, as captives to live among the tribe: Mary Draper Ingles and her two sons, Thomas, age 4, and George, age 2, Mary's sister-in-law Bettie Robertson Draper, and Mary's neighbor Henry Lenard (also spelled Leonard).

=== Estimates of casualties ===
Only four persons have been definitively identified as having been killed at Draper's Meadow: Colonel Patton, Caspar Barger Eleanor Draper, and Bettie Robertson Draper's baby. Letitia Preston Floyd's letter says that the Indians reported to Mrs. Lybrook that "they had killed two men one woman and three children," and Floyd further identifies two of the dead children as belonging to William Ingles, although there is no evidence that Ingles had any children in 1755 aside from his sons George and Thomas. William Preston compiled "Preston's Register," titled "A Register of the Persons Who Have Been Either Killed, Wounded, or Taken Prisoners by the Enemy, in Augusta County, as also such as Have Made Their Escape," but it lists only the four confirmed deaths noted above. John Ingles says that the Shawnee "killed severale," and refers to Patton's death and "some other persons not recollected." The Virginia Gazette article of 8 August reports Patton's death "and eight more Men, Women, and Children," for a total of nine deaths. Floyd, Ingles and Preston's Register all agree that James Cull and Bettie Draper were wounded. The number and identities of the captives are consistently reported in all sources. Letitia Preston Floyd's letter is the only source mentioning the deaths of two Shawnee warriors, killed by Colonel Patton.

== Aftermath ==
Colonel John Buchanan sent a party of soldiers from the Augusta County militia after the Shawnees, but they failed to locate them and returned empty-handed. On 11 August Governor Robert Dinwiddie wrote to Buchanan: "I am sorry the Men You sent after the Murderers did not come up with them."

Letitia Preston Floyd reported in her 1843 letter that when William Preston and John Draper returned to Draper's Meadow, on either the same day or the next day, "they found Patton, Mrs. Draper, the mother of Mrs. Ingles, and the children buried." The location of the graves of those killed in the massacre remains unknown, but it is believed to be in the vicinity of the Duck Pond on the campus of Virginia Tech. There is no record of their burial site among documents by William Preston and other members of his family.

In mid-October Mary escaped from Big Bone Lick, Kentucky, without her children, and made a 42-day journey of more than eight hundred miles (1,300 km) across the Appalachian Mountains together with another woman, reaching Draper's Meadow on 1 December 1755. Letitia Preston Floyd claimed that Mary was pregnant when captured and gave birth "3 months after her capture" to a daughter, and that she abandoned her baby when she decided to escape, however there is evidence to the contrary.

In February 1756, the Sandy Creek Expedition was sent to attack Lower Shawneetown, where Mary Ingles had briefly been held prisoner, however the expedition was forced to turn back before reaching the town, due to harsh weather and lack of food.

In September 1756, Governor Dinwiddie wrote to Colonel Clement Read: "Give Stalniker £100 to...build a little Stockade Fort at Draper's Meadow." However, no evidence has been found that the fort was ever built.

Survivors relocated in 1757 to Blockhouse Bottom near what is now East Point, Kentucky. Draper's Meadow was abandoned, as was much of the frontier for the duration of the French and Indian War. Of the original settlers who survived the massacre, only the Bargers returned later to reclaim their land and settle. William Preston, who had been in Draper's Meadow on the morning of the attack but was sent by Colonel Patton to assist with the harvest at Sinking Creek and so was saved, purchased the property on 24 May 1773, and completed the construction of his Smithfield Plantation home in 1774. The neighboring community of Blacksburg was established in the 1790s by Samuel Black and his sons John and William.

In 1761, Mary's sister-in-law Bettie Robertson Draper was found and ransomed by her husband John Draper after six years in captivity. In 1768, Mary's son Thomas Ingles was ransomed and returned to Virginia at the age of 17. One source states that another captive, Mary's neighbor Henry Leonard, later escaped, although no details are given. Mary's two-year-old son George was taken from her and is believed to have died in captivity.

After her escape, Mary Draper Ingles reunited with her husband and resumed farming at Dunkard's Bottom until the following spring. Concerned about continued Shawnee raids on neighboring settlements, they moved to Fort Vause, where a small garrison safeguarded the residents. Mary remained uneasy, however, and persuaded her husband to move again, this time to Pulaski County, Virginia. In 1762 they established Ingles Ferry across the New River, along with a tavern and a blacksmith shop. Mary died there in 1815.

== Sources ==
Except for a few scattered references to these events in contemporary reports and letters, the only primary source is an article in the Virginia Gazette on 8 August 1755:

"By an Express this Morning from Augusta County, we have the melancholy Account of the Murder of Col. James Patton, who was killed by a Party of Indians, the last Day of July, on the Head Branches of Roanoke, and eight more Men, Women, and Children. Col. Patton was going out with Ammunition &c. for the Use of the Frontier Inhabitants, and stopping at a Plantation on the Road to refresh himself, the Convoy being about five Miles before, he was beset by 16 Indians, who killed, and stripped him, and then made off with his Horse &c."

An important secondary source is the 1824 written account by Colonel John Ingles (son of Mary Ingles and William Ingles, born in 1766 after Mary's return). His account, written when he was 58, is based on stories he had heard from his parents.

=== Letitia Preston Floyd ===
Another significant secondary source is an 1843 letter by Letitia Preston Floyd, wife of Virginia Governor John Floyd and daughter of Colonel William Preston, who survived the Draper's Meadow massacre. Her account, written when she was 63, is based on Preston family lore and oral tradition.

There are some differences between the narratives of John Ingles and Letitia Preston Floyd, suggesting that the Ingles and Preston families had developed distinct oral traditions. The disagreements between these sources include the date of the massacre (July 30 vs July 8, according to Ingles and Floyd, respectively), the number of casualties, the ages of Mary Ingles' children, and several other aspects. Evidence supports the July 30 date, as documents confirm that Colonel James Patton was in Williamsburg on July 8. The article in the Virginia Gazette reports that Patton's death took place on "the last day of July." Preston's Register gives the date unequivocally as 30 July.

Letitia Preston Floyd's 1843 letter to her son Benjamin Rush Floyd, written at the request of historian Lyman Draper, contains the most complete description of the Draper's Meadow massacre. Preston Davie (a descendant who spent many years collecting documents in an attempt to establish James Patton's genealogy) dismissed the letter as "replete with errors...Indeed some of the events as described in this letter are such a jumble of inaccurate hearsay and fact as to make them more imaginative than real." Glanville and Mays counter this opinion: "The overall accuracy of Mrs. Floyd’s 'My Dear Rush' letter is surprisingly good...She made minor errors in dates and places. However, it seems to us that Mrs. Floyd did remarkably well for a person aged 63 who was often writing of events about which she learned four or five decades earlier."

John Peter Hale (1824–1902), one of Mary Ingles’ great-grandsons, claimed to have interviewed Letitia Preston Floyd, and his 1886 narrative contains numerous details not cited in any previous account.

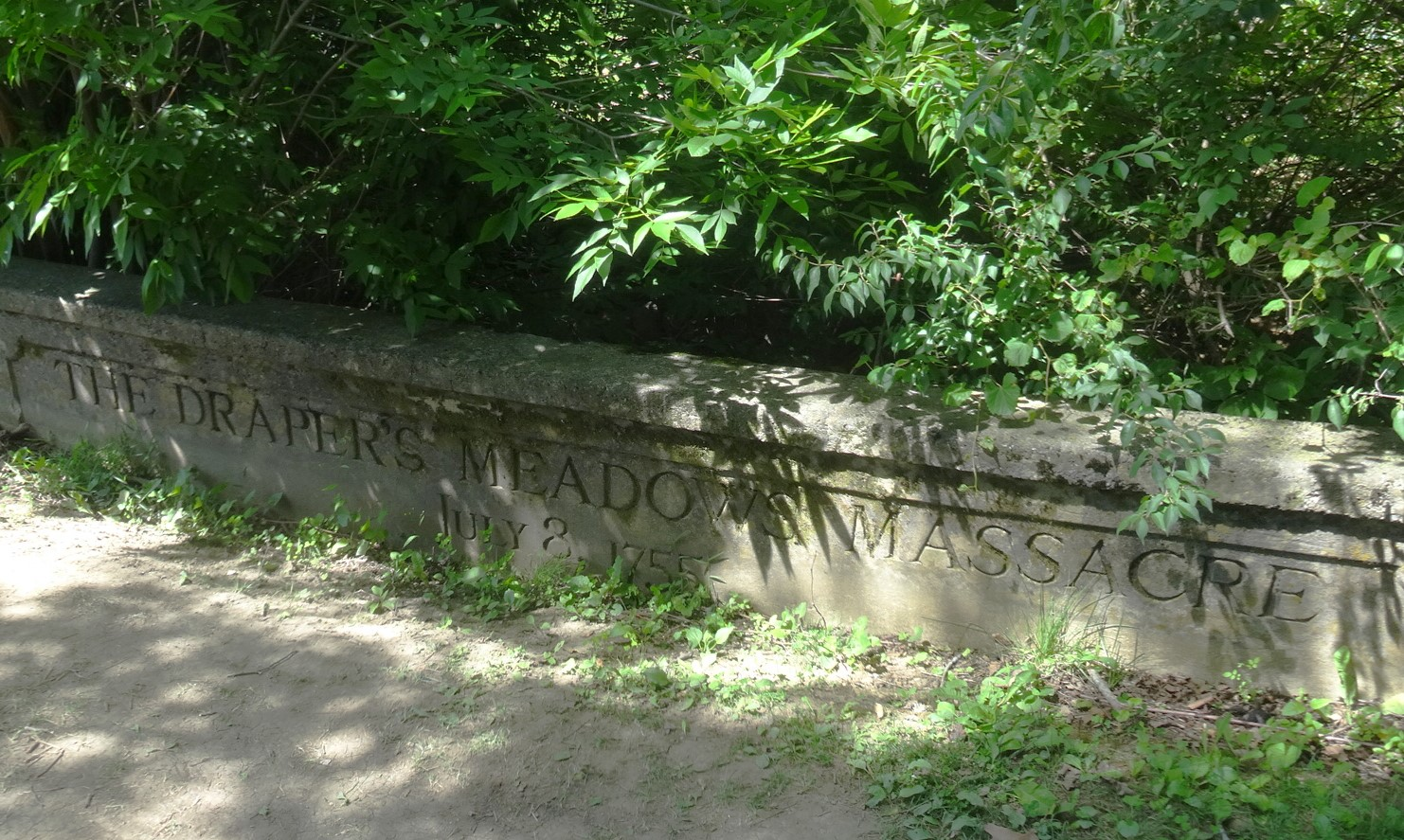
Draper's Meadow Massacre memorial in Blacksburg, Virginia

== Popular culture ==
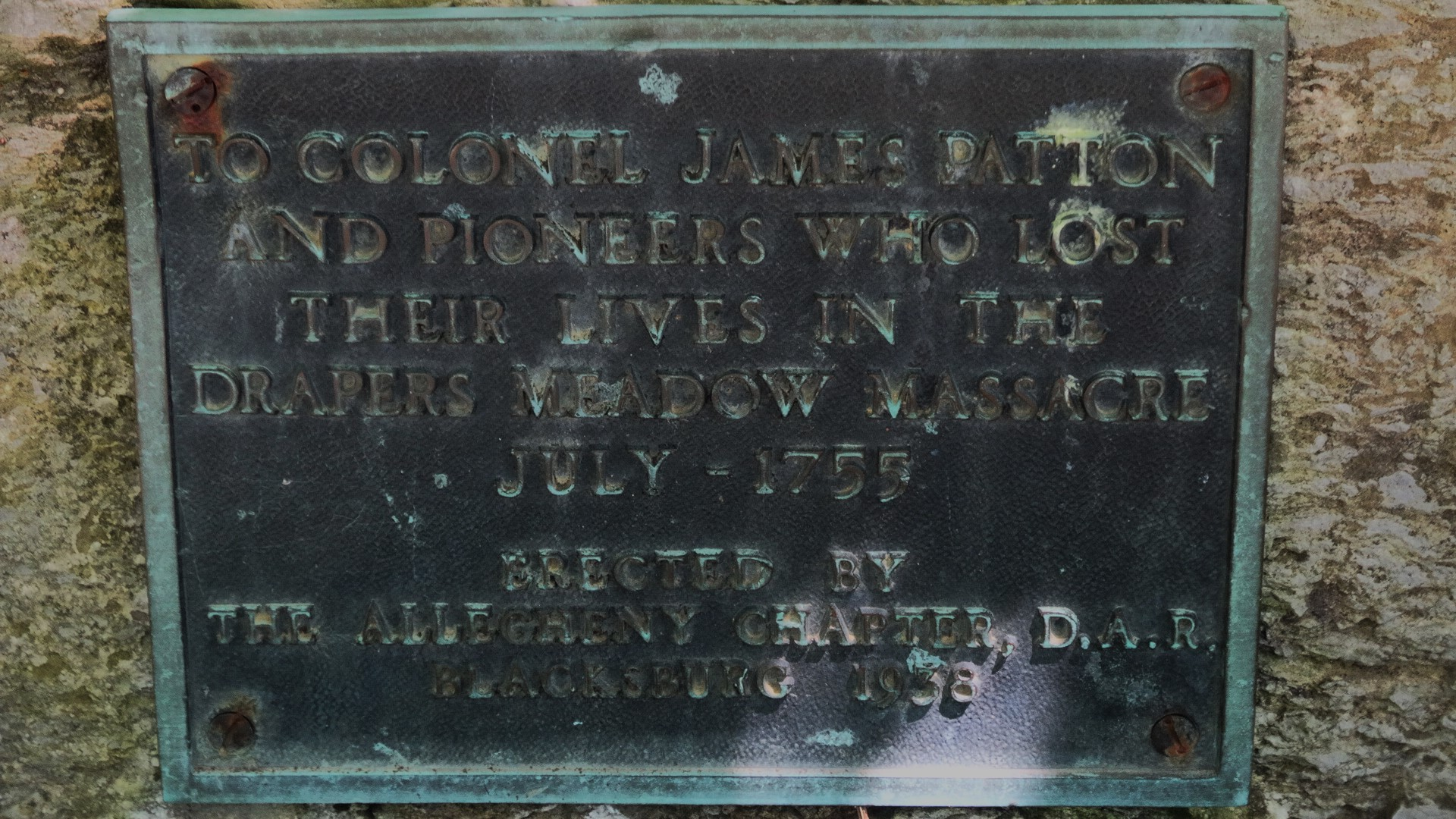
Memorial plaque to Colonel James Patton and pioneers killed at Draper's Meadow Massacre.

The story of Mary Draper Ingles' escape and journey home has inspired a number of books, films, and living history programs, including the popular 1981 novel Follow the River by James Alexander Thom, a 1995 ABC television movie Follow the River, and the 2004 film The Captives.

An outdoor drama is performed each summer in Radford, Virginia titled, "Walk to Freedom: The Mary Draper Ingles Story," which details the events during the attack at Drapers Meadows and Mary Draper Ingles' trek through the wilderness to reach her home in the New River Valley. The original play, "The Long Way Home," ran from 1971 to 1999. In 2017, the play was revived and simplified and has been presented each July since 2018.

== Memorialization ==
A wall on the Virginia Tech campus, between the golf course clubhouse and the duck pond, commemorates the massacre, with the date "July 8, 1755" inscribed on it.

In 1938, the Alleghany Chapter of the National Society Daughters of the American Revolution (NSDAR) placed a brass memorial plaque at Smithfield Plantation, near the site of the Draper's Meadow Massacre in Blacksburg, on the Virginia Tech campus, on which is written: "To Colonel James Patton and pioneers who lost their lives in the Draper's Meadow Massacre, July 1755."
