= John Buchanan (Virginia colonist) =

Virginia soldier & settler (??–1769)

- Born: County Donegal, Ireland or Pennsylvania
- Died: 1769; Greenfield (Fincastle, Virginia), Botetourt County, Virginia, Colony of Virginia
- Years active: 1741-1769
- Known for: Virginia leadership and development
- Title: Augusta County magistrate, Augusta County Sheriff, Justice of the Peace, coroner, surveyor, collector of duty on skins and furs, tax collector and exterminator of wolves
- Spouse: Margaret Patton
- Parent(s): James Buchanan and Jane Sayers
- Relatives: Children: Mary, James, John, Margaret, Jane, William, Anna
- Military career
- Allegiance: Colony of Virginia
- Service years: 1742-1769
- Rank: Colonel of the Augusta County Militia
- Units: Virginia militia, Augusta County militia
- Conflicts: Battle of Galudoghson (1742), Sandy Creek Expedition (1756)

John Buchanan (died 1769) was colonial Virginia landowner, magistrate, colonel in the Virginia Militia, deputy surveyor under Thomas Lewis, and Sheriff of Augusta County, Virginia. As a surveyor, Buchanan was able to locate and purchase some of the most desirable plots of land in western Virginia and quickly became wealthy and politically influential. As magistrate, sheriff and a colonel the Augusta County Militia, he was already well-connected when his father-in-law Colonel James Patton was killed in 1755. Buchanan had replaced Patton in several key roles by the time of his own death in 1769.

Buchanan is often referred to in official documents as "John Buchanan, Gent.", while his brother-in-law, Captain John Buchanan, is usually referred to as "John Buchanan, yeoman." Both men owned land on the New River and the Holston River and are frequently confused. Captain Buchanan married Colonel Buchanan's sister Martha.

== Birth and early life ==
Little is known for certain of Buchanan's birthplace or his life before 1741. Buchanan may have been born in County Donegal, Ireland or in Pennsylvania. His date of birth is disputed, with sources variously citing 1699, 1716, and 1728. Several sources say he was the son of James Buchanan and Jane Sayers, and that the family lived for a time in Northumberland County, Pennsylvania. Lyman Draper states that before coming to America, he "had figured in the wars of Scotland," although no details or source is given, and Draper may have confused John Buchanan with his father James. Lyman Draper's collected papers of William Preston (1731-1791) contains information suggesting that Buchanan immigrated from Ireland in 1738 with his father James, and James Patton.

Letitia Floyd Lewis, granddaughter of William Preston, wrote a letter to Robert William Hughes, dated 13 June 1879, describing her family history. Although the original letter appears to be lost, a transcription was printed in The Richmond Standard on 18 September 1880. The letter says that:

"...Col. James Patton, who with his friends and relatives James and John Buchanan, and John Lewis and John Preston, emigrated from the north of Ireland, near Londonderry, to Augusta Co, Va., in the year 1736. They had previously settled for a short time in Northampton Co., Pa. The then route of emigration and discovery was up the Valley of Virginia from Pennsylvania, though the first landing, as my mother told me, of these emigrants was near Alexandria, Virginia, at some place known as Belle Haven (at the mouth of Cameron Run)...Colonel John Buchanan married Margaret [Patton], and they had three children - also daughters; one of them, Jane, was my ancestress; another, Margaret...was the mother of General William Campbell, the hero of King's Mountain. Colonel John Buchanan was the son of Colonel James Buchanan and his wife Jane Sayers, of Northampton Co., Pa."

== Military service ==
On 24 June 1742, Buchanan qualified as a captain in the Augusta County militia.

In December 1742, the militia engaged in combat with a group of twenty-two Onondaga and seven Oneida Indians who had traveled to Virginia from Shamokin in Pennsylvania, under the command of an Iroquois chief named Jonnhaty, to participate in a campaign against the Catawba. An account of the battle, known as the Battle of Galudoghson, was given to Conrad Weiser by Shikellamy's grandson in February, 1743. The grandson claimed that suspicious white settlers, thinking that this war party planned to raid Virginia settlements, attacked them. The settlers later reported that the Indians had killed several hogs and horses belonging to the settlers, and "went to Peoples houses, Scared the women and Children [and] took what they wanted." The militia were called in, and Patton ordered them to escort the war party out of Augusta County. The militia followed the warriors for two days, until one of the Indians made a detour into the forest near Balcony Falls, possibly to relieve himself, and a militiaman fired at him. The Indians then attacked and killed the militia captain, John McDowell. In the battle that followed, three or four of the Indian warriors and eight or ten militiamen were killed. According to Colonel Patton, the Indians fled into the forest and were pursued for "several hundred yards" by Captain Buchanan and eight militiamen.

On 18 November 1752, Buchanan was promoted to colonel of horse and foot.

Following the Draper's Meadow massacre of July 1755, Buchanan sent a company from the Augusta County militia to pursue the Shawnee warriors responsible for the massacre, but they were unable to locate them. On 11 August Governor Robert Dinwiddie wrote to Buchanan: "I am sorry the Men You sent after the Murderers did not come up with them." In late 1755, he succeeded Colonel Patton as commander-in-Chief of the Augusta County Militia. The next spring he moved to Cherry Tree Bottom Plantation at Looney's Ferry on the James River, where he was visited by Colonel George Washington in October.

In February–April 1756, Buchanan led a company of rangers on the Sandy Creek Expedition, intended to assault the Shawnee village known as Lower Shawneetown, from which raids on Virginia settlements had been launched. The expedition was forced to turn back due to harsh weather and lack of supplies.

On 27 July 1756, Buchanan presided over a council of war, held at the Augusta County Courthouse, "to meet and consult on the most proper places to build forts along the fronteers for the protection of the Inhabitants." Present were Colonel David Stewart, Major John Brown, and ten captains, all officers of the Augusta County militia. The council decided on the locations of fifteen forts to be built in a "chain" across the county. The council determined that 680 men would need to be recruited to man these and several other existing forts. Samuel Stalnaker represented the Holston Settlement and recommended that stockade forts be built at Dunkard's Bottom on the New River and Davis' Bottom at the middle fork of the Holston River.

On 23 August 1756, Governor Dinwiddie wrote Peter Hog: “I have recommended Colo. Buchanan to him [Clement Read] for Augusta Coty. I have a bad Opinion of Colo. Stewarts Conduct, & before he receives any Mony, I shall make a Strict Scrutiny into his Demands, & think it must go through Buchanan's Hands."

In 1758, Buchanan supervised the construction of Fort Fauquier, which replaced Robert Looney's Fort, built in 1755 near Looney's Ferry in Botetourt County.

On 17 November 1768 he qualified as Lieutenant of Augusta County.

== Legal roles ==
Buchanan served as an Orange County magistrate for the Augusta district from 3 November 1741 to 10 October 1745, at which time the Virginia Council included him as the third most senior magistrate (subordinate only to James Patton and John Lewis) in the first Augusta County commission of the peace In 1742 he was appointed tax collector and exterminator of wolves. On 9 December 1745, Buchanan was appointed justice in the newly formed Augusta County, and on 9 December 1745 he qualified as a deputy sheriff. On 16 July 1746, he qualified as sheriff. At that time Buchanan was also a deputy surveyor under Thomas Lewis.

On 18 November 1752, Buchanan qualified as coroner. In 1759 he was appointed collector of duty on skins and furs, and in 1761 Sheriff of Augusta County.

== Religious activities ==
In 1746, by order of Governor William Gooch, Buchanan and eleven other men were elected to the Augusta County Vestry.

== Woods River Company ==
The Wood's River Grant for 100,000 acres of land on the Wood's River (later renamed the New River) was issued in the spring of 1745 to Colonel James Patton, with Buchanan being appointed agent and surveyor. Patton immediately formed the Wood's River Company, known later as the New River Company. Among his 20 company members were John Buchanan, George Robinson, James Wood, Adam Harman, Israel Lorton, and Peter Rentfroe. Patton wanted corporate power to negotiate profitable purchases and sales and to participate in treaties with Native Americans, but the company made only a few purchases and dissolved after Patton's death in 1755.

On 7 October 1745, Buchanan mentioned in his journal that he transcribed John Peter Salling's journal during a six-day visit with Salling. As a member of the John Howard expedition, March to July 1742, Salling had reached the New River, and Buchanan was interested in surveying the area as part of the 1745 Wood's River land grant.

== Surveying and land acquisitions ==
He moved to Orange (now Augusta) County, Virginia in 1740. Buchanan became an assistant surveyor for James Patton and worked closely with Patton's nephew William Preston under Thomas Lewis to survey lands for the Woods River Company. As a surveyor, he was able to locate some of the best lands in western Virginia and purchased nearly 5,000 acres for himself.

- On 24 September 1741, he bought 784 acres in Beverley Manor adjoining James Patton, Patrick Campbell and land already in his possession from William Beverley for £24.
- On 12 February 1742, he received a grant from the Colony of Virginia of 400 acres on a branch of the Roanoke River.
- On 6 April 1743, he bought 293 acres on Moffetts Creek from Benjamin Borden.
- When Buchanan surveyed large areas in southwest Virginia in October and November 1747, he acquired 880 acres "at the Richlands near Asp Bottoms", 684 acres "on Chestnut Creek on Woods River", 1000 acres "at Asp Bottom on Indian (now Holston) River" and 550 acres "at the place called Richlands".
- On 28 November 1750, he bought 416 1/2 acres on Nutt Creek from William Nutt and renamed it "Mill Creek." He operated a mill on the site.
- On 18 March 1760, he bought 63 acres on Christians Creek from William Curry.

In early 1748, Buchanan accompanied Dr. Thomas Walker and James Patton on a journey west, as far south as the "Fork Country of the Holston" (present-day Kingsport, Sullivan County, Tennessee), to survey the westernmost lands which were included as part of Patton's 1745 land grant.

=== Fraud claims ===
In 1781, Buchanan's career as a surveyor became the focus of a major investigation, as a result of a lawsuit filed by William Ingles over his holdings in Burkes Garden. Buchanan had evidently worked as a surveyor without a license, which was obtained by surveyors in Virginia after passing an examination at the College of William and Mary. The issue focused on the legality of the surveys done by Buchanan, which would have been rendered null and void if it was revealed that he was unlicensed. Thomas Lewis wrote to William Preston in a letter dated 7 August 1781:

"Mr Trigg presented me with a Summons to appear before the Court of Commissioners in September as a witness with regard some claims of Wm. Ingliss relative to Burks Garden in Consequence of some contract with one Burk by Col. Patton...I understand by Trigg what is wanted from me is to say whether Col. Buchanan was duly commissioned by the masters of the Colledge to Survey. I suppose you know he was not, he only gave a bond to me for ye due performance of deputy. All this was done not indeed with my approbation but at ye pressing instance of Col Patton, a circumstance that my giving way to has given me many times much uneasiness."

Comparisons of Buchanan's and Preston's survey measurements with modern-day measurements show that both Preston and Buchanan underreported the acreage that they surveyed for James Patton, in order to reduce the amount of quitrent Patton owed. It seems likely that Buchanan and Preston used a fraudulent Gunter's chain that was forty percent longer than the legally standardized chain, in order to complete their surveys. Other landowners, including Dr. Thomas Walker, probably knew that the measurements were inaccurate, and took advantage of the deception to defraud the colonial land office of the amount of payment due for land patents.

== Roadbuilding in the Shenandoah Valley ==
In May 1745, John Buchanan and his future father-in-law James Patton conducted a survey for "a Road from the County line of Frederick [County] to the upper Inhabitants of Augusta [County] on Woods River." They began laying out the road through the Shenandoah Valley from Winchester to Staunton and later down to Roanoke and what would become Blacksburg. Initially known as the "Indian Road" because parts of it followed the Great Indian Warpath, it was incorporated into the "Great Wagon Road" which ran from Knoxville, Tennessee to Philadelphia. This road facilitated travel for settlers heading into what is now West Virginia. Parts of the original road later became U.S. Route 11 in Virginia and other parts follow Virginia State Route 42.

== Marriage and family ==
On 17 June 1749, John Buchanan married Margaret Patton, daughter of Colonel James Patton. They built a log cabin on the bank above Reed Creek in Wythe County, near Fort Chiswell. In 1756, they moved to Cherry Tree Bottom plantation at Looney's Ferry on the James River, at the mouth of Purgatory Creek, near where the town of Buchanan now stands. Buchanan had inherited this "small stone house" from his father-in-law James Patton. Buchanan was planning to move to their 1,200 acre Anchor and Hope plantation on Reed Creek when he died in mid-1769. Buchanan had surveyed the plantation in 1748 and patented it in 1753.

John and Margaret had seven children:

- Mary Buchanan (1750 - 1820), married Andrew Boyd.
- James Buchanan (b. about 1752 - d. before 1816), living in Fayette County, Kentucky in 1799.
- John Buchanan Jr. (b. about 1754 - 1777), killed at the Battle of Saratoga.
- Margaret "Peggy" Buchanan (1755 - 1827), married Joseph Drake, 1773.
- Jane Buchanan (b. about 1759 - 1812), married John Floyd.
- William Buchanan (b. after 1760), killed in Kentucky.
- Anna Buchanan (b. 1765), married Ephraim Drake, brother of Joseph Drake.

On 22 January 1767, Buchanan purchased six slaves at a cost of £337.10 total, as a gift for his daughter Mary.

== Death ==
Buchanan died between June and August 1769, in Greenfield (Fincastle, Virginia). His will was dated 25 June and proved 16 August. It mentions his three sons, James, William and John, his daughter Mary Boyd, wife of Andrew Boyd, and three younger daughters who are not named. After Buchanan's death, his wife Margaret married William Anderson in 1796, and they moved to Kentucky.

Historians Mary and Frederick Kegley described Buchanan's death:

"Whilst Col. Preston lived at Greenfield, John Buchanan determined to leave his residence near Pattonsburg and remove to Reed Creek to settle at Anchor and Hope, a splendid estate Col. Patton had given his daughter Margaret. On his journey he stopped at Greenfield, took sick and died after several weeks illness. Whilst on his death bed he desired Mrs. Preston to take care of his daughter, Jane, then ten years old; this was done. Col. Buchanan made Col. Preston the executor of his immense estate, a long and unbroken friendship existed between them."

== Memorialization ==
The town of Buchanan, Virginia is named after John Buchanan.

A historical marker commemorating Looney's Ferry, Buchanan's Cherry Tree Bottom home and Fort Fauquier, is located on Main Street (US Route 11) in Buchanan, Virginia.

A 1932 historical marker, located on the west side of US 52, just south of I-81, commemorates Buchanan's home at the Anchor and Hope Plantation.
