= Sandy Creek Expedition =

Part of the French and Indian War in 1756

- Part of French and Indian War
| Date | February 19, 1756 – April 7, 1756 |
| Location | Western West Virginia |
| Result | Expedition aborted |

Belligerents
| Virginia; Cherokee | Shawnee |

Commanders and leaders
| Major Andrew Lewis; Outacite Ostenaco | |

Units involved
| Virginia Regiment; Cherokee | |

Strength
| 220 (8 units Virginia infantry and volunteers); 130 Cherokee warriors | |

Casualties and losses
| Killed: 2 | 1 Shawnee prisoner |

The Sandy Creek Expedition, also known as the Sandy Expedition or the Big Sandy Expedition, (not to be confused with the Big Sandy Expedition of 1861) was a 1756 campaign by Virginia Regiment soldiers and Cherokee warriors into modern-day West Virginia against the Shawnee, who were raiding the British colony of Virginia's frontier. The campaign set out in mid-February, 1756, and was immediately slowed by harsh weather and inadequate provisions. With morale failing, the expedition was forced to turn back in mid-March without encountering the enemy.

The expedition was the first allied military campaign between the British and the Cherokees against the French and their allied Native Americans, and Virginia's only military offensive taking place during the French and Indian War.

== Background ==
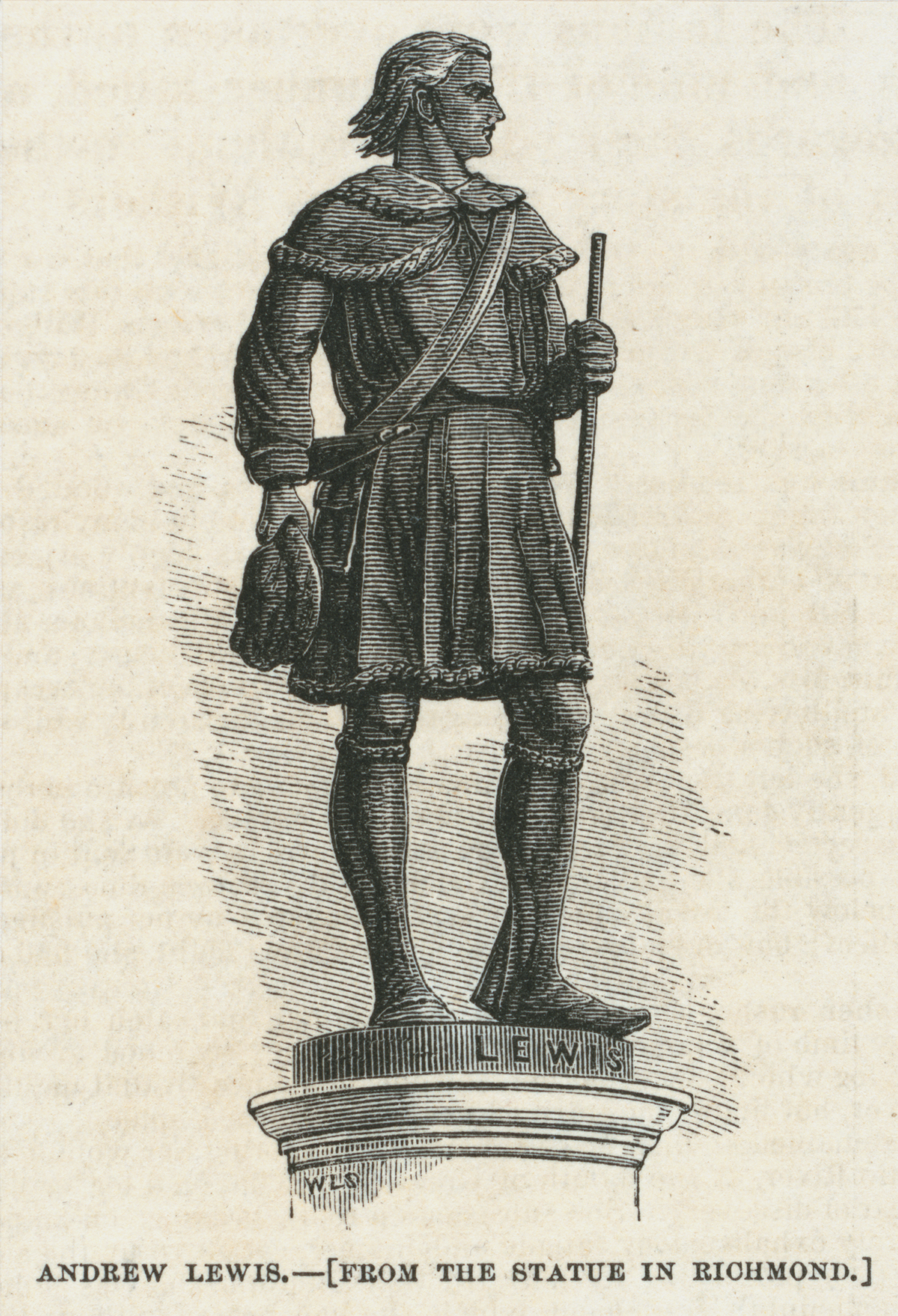
Andrew Lewis (from the statue in Richmond).

The campaign was initiated in early 1756 by Virginia's Lieutenant Governor Robert Dinwiddie in response to Indian raids on settlements in the New River, Greenbrier River, and Tygart River valleys, during which about 70 settlers were killed, wounded, or captured. Farms and communities were abandoned as survivors retreated east into the Shenandoah Valley. In June, 1755, Shawnee warriors captured Captain Samuel Stalnaker at his homestead on the Holston River, (near present-day Chilhowie, Virginia), and killed his wife and son. In July, Mary Draper Ingles and her children were captured during the Draper's Meadow Massacre, (near present-day Blacksburg, Virginia). Both Ingles and Stalnaker later escaped captivity and walked hundreds of miles to return home. After arriving home in November, 1755, Mary Draper Ingles informed her husband William Ingles of the general location and layout of Lower Shawneetown, where she had lived as a captive for about three weeks. William Ingles may have suggested to Governor Dinwiddie the idea for an attack on this large Native American community, which was the main Shawnee village at the confluence of the Ohio River and the Scioto River. Stalnaker was also held at Lower Shawneetown, where Mary Ingles met him and other captives taken in settlement raids. He escaped in May, 1756.

In retaliation against the Shawnee raids, Dinwiddie sent four companies of Virginia Rangers (each consisting of forty men) from Augusta and Hanover counties, four smaller volunteer companies, and 130 Cherokee warriors to attack Lower Shawneetown. Colonel George Washington (then in command of the Virginia Regiment) selected Major Andrew Lewis to lead the expedition.

=== Preston's Rangers ===
In 1755, Governor Dinwiddie had ordered the formation of several "ranging companies" to protect settlements from attacks by Native tribes allied with the French, to garrison forts and reinforce areas expecting attack. Captain William Preston established one of the first of these Virginia Rangers companies. In September, 1755, Dinwiddie wrote to him:

"I approve of Y'r Intentions to range the Woods w'th Detachments from three Compa's, and by no means continue in one Place, but proceed wherever You think the Indians may come to annoy our back settlem'ts, and I expect a Number of the Cherokees will be with You this Winter."

The only offensive action of the Virginia Rangers during the French and Indian War was the Sandy Creek Expedition.

=== Role of the Cherokees ===
Cherokee leaders had recently been trying to improve trade relations with the Virginia colonial government, and had petitioned Governor Dinwiddie for some assistance in the long-delayed construction of a fort in South Carolina, to protect Cherokee communities from raids by French-allied Shawnee and Catawba Indians. Dinwiddie offered to finance the construction of a fort in eastern Tennessee, and in return the Cherokees sent 130 warriors to Fort Frederick to support the Sandy Creek Expedition.

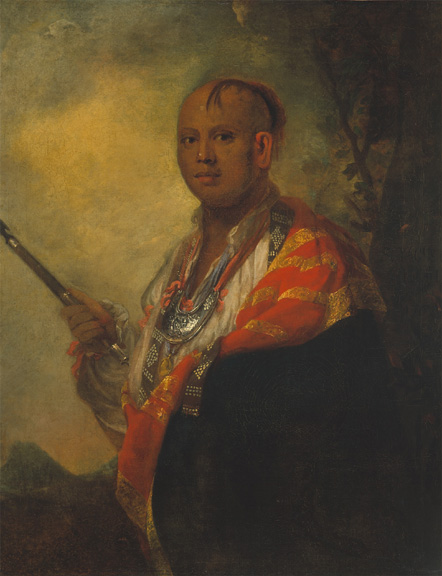
Portrait of Chief Ostenaco in 1762, by Joshua Reynolds.

On 14 December, 1755, the governor wrote to Colonel Washington:

"The Cherokees have taken up the Hatchet against the French & Shawnesse, & have sent 130 of their Warriors to New River, & propose to march immediately to attack, & cut off the Shawnesse, in their Towns. I design they shall be join'd with three Companies of Rangers, & Capt. Hogg's Company, & I propose Colo. Stephens or Majr. Lewis to be the Commander of the Party on this Expedition."

The Cherokee warriors were under the joint leadership of Captain Richard Pearis and Chief Outacite Ostenaco. Dinwiddie had agreed to supply them with guns and ammunition, but could only obtain older, heavier rifles for the Cherokees, writing on 15 January, 1756: "I have sent 150 Small Arms, Powder and Shott...I know they are too heavy but I have desired they may have the lightest [that] are among our people..."

The Cherokees offered to train Virginian soldiers in Indian-style warfare, which favored shooting from behind cover, using stealth and surprise, rather than firing in volleys from assembled ranks. Washington wanted Virginian troops to adopt these tactics, and noted,

"...five hundred Indians have it more in their power to annoy the Inhabitants, than ten times their number of Regulars. For, besides the advantageous way they have of fighting in the Woods, their cunning and craft are not to be equalled; neither their activity and indefatigable Sufferings: They prowl about like Wolves; and like them, do their mischief by Stealth...It is in their power to be of infinite use to us; and without Indians, we shall never be able to cope with those cruel Foes to our Country..."

On 13 January, 1756, Washington wrote to Dinwiddie: "I have given all necessary orders for training the Men to a proper use of their Arms, and the method of Ind'n Fighting, and hope in a little time to make them expert." Dinwiddie approved, writing to Washington on 23 January: "You have done very right in ordering the Men to be train'd in the [Indian] Method of fighting..." The Virginians also needed to learn woodcraft and the art of tracking enemies through the wilderness. The son of the Cherokee chief Conocotocko I commented to Dinwiddie: "Our brothers [the Virginians] fight very strong, but can't follow an Indian by the Foot as we can."

=== Timing and route ===
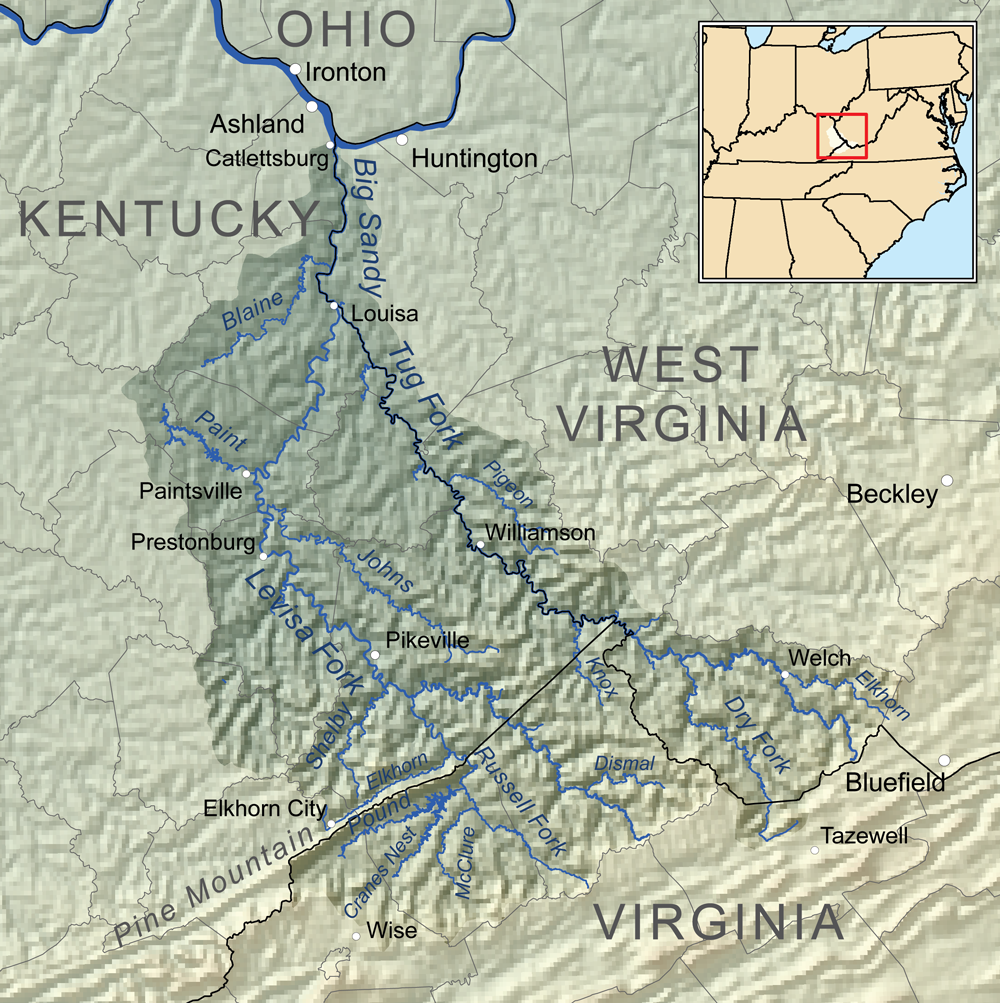
Area of the Sandy Creek Expedition

Major Lewis decided not to use the shorter and easier route to Lower Shawneetown, which would have been along the New River to the Kanawha River, because he was afraid the Shawnee would be more likely to learn about the expedition. Instead, he chose a less-traveled route through uninhabited mountains, following a war trail along "Sandy Creek," (now known as the Dry Fork), then following the Tug Fork to the Big Sandy River that forms the West Virginia-Kentucky border today. The expedition passed through present-day McDowell County and Mingo County. The decision to launch the expedition in February was based on the assumption that the Big Sandy would be swollen by snowmelt, making it easier and faster to descend by canoe. Also, Washington apparently had received intelligence indicating that many of Lower Shawneetown's warriors had "removed up the River, into the Neighbourhood of [Fort] Duquesne," leaving the town temporarily defenseless.

== Expedition ==
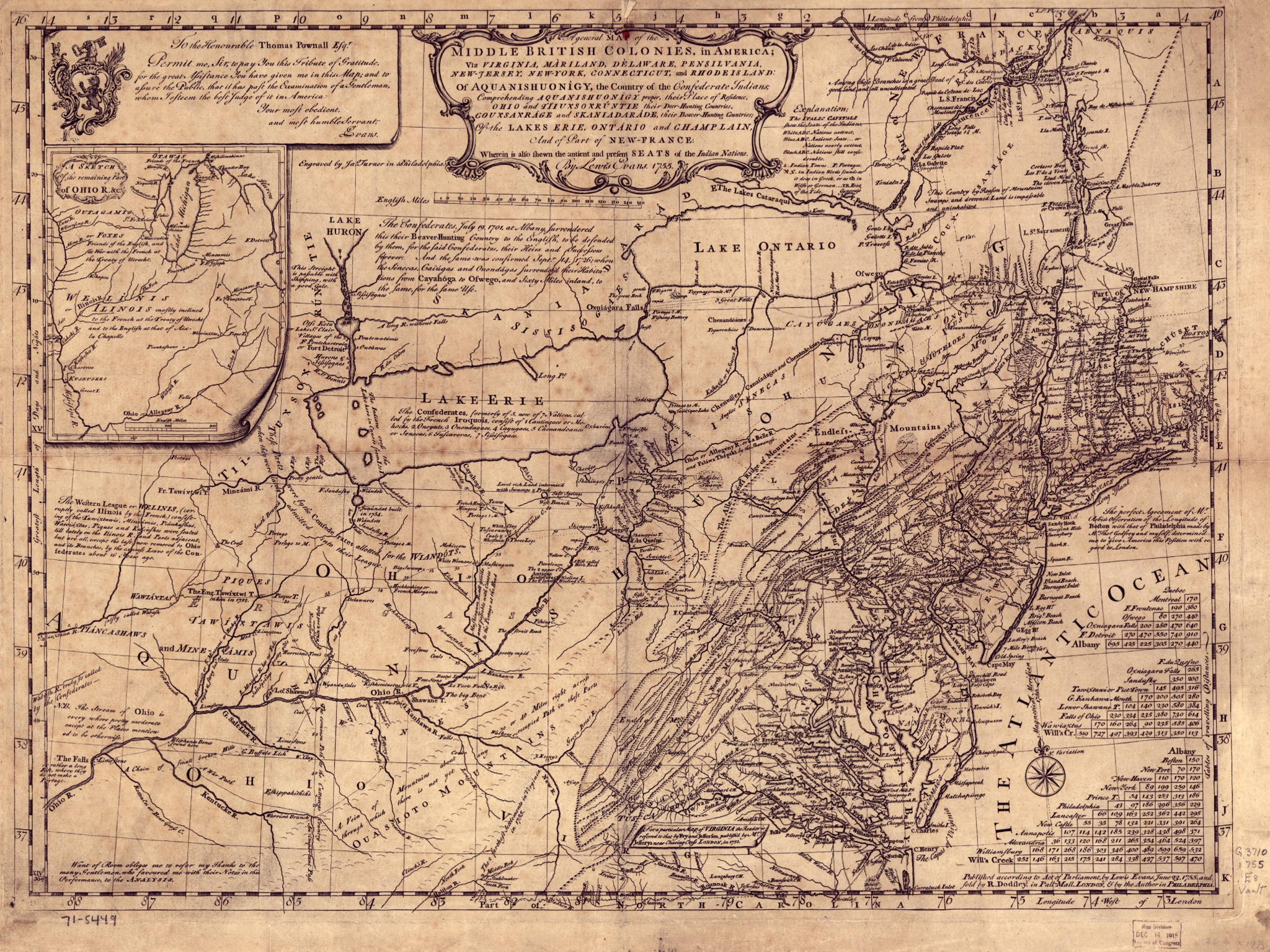
1755 map by Lewis Evans showing "Lor Shawnee T." to the lower left of map's center.

On 6 February, 1756, Dinwiddie wrote to Lewis: "The distance by Evans' map is not two hundred miles to the Upper Towns of the Shawnees, however, at once begin your march."

On 9 February, the Virginians assembled at Fort Prince George, near Roanoke, Virginia and marched to meet the Cherokees at the newly built Fort Frederick on the New River. They brought with them over two thousand pounds of dried beef, intended as provisions for the campaign. Among the troops was Lieutenant William Ingles, husband of Mary Draper Ingles, and Captain William Preston, both survivors of the Draper's Meadow Massacre. On 19 February the full contingent of 340 men and 27 pack horses set out, crossing over the north fork of the Holston River and camping on 23 February at Burke's Garden.

The Cherokees were familiar with the rugged terrain and the exertion necessary for wilderness warfare, unlike most of the Virginians, who had never fought a winter campaign in the mountains. Cutting trails through the thickly-forested valleys, scaling steep slopes, and crossing rivers and creeks repeatedly was slow and exhausting due to harsh weather and streams swollen with snowmelt and rain. They reached the headwaters of the Big Sandy River on 28 February, where Captain Preston wrote:

"Saturday 28th We marched 10 oClock & passed several branches of Clinch and at length got to the head of Sandy Creek where we met with great trouble & fatigue occasioned by a very heavy rain and the driving of our baggage horses down sd Creek which we crossed 20 times that evening."

On 29 February, Captain Preston wrote in his journal: "The creek has been much frequently used by Indians both traveling and hunting on it, and...I am apprehensive that Stalnaker and the prisoners taken with him were carried this way."

During the first weeks the troops supplemented their rations with bear meat, deer, and buffalo. They gathered potatoes from abandoned gardens. However, within a few days flour and dried beef ran short and rations were cut by half. By 3 March, the last of the corn brought to feed the horses was gone. The men hunted, but the few deer and elk they killed were insufficient to feed 340 troops. Lewis suggested that they slaughter and eat their horses, but the men refused. The weather was extremely cold and snow made progress even slower. Lieutenant Thomas Morton, who kept a diary of the expedition, wrote:

"...In our Camps was little else but cursing, swearing, confusion and complaining...and we are now suf'ring very much for want of provision, and a great part of the men...have this day fallen on a resolution to go back, for we can see nothing before us but inevitable destruction."

The expedition paused on 7 March to build canoes, with the hope that traveling by water would be less tiresome. Captain Preston estimated that by 8 March they had traveled 186 miles. On 12 March, an accident led to the loss of guns and tents. Captain Preston wrote in his diary for that day:

"Capt. Woodson now arrived with some of his company, with the intelligence that his canoe overset, and he had lost his tents, and every thing valuable in it; that Major Lewis' canoe was sunk in the river, and that the Major, Capt. Overton, Lieut. Gun, and one other man had to swim for their lives, and that several things of value were lost, particularly five or six fine guns."

Rations were by now nearly exhausted and men began to desert, trying to make their way home in small groups, most of whom did not survive. On 13 March, Lewis asked which of his troops were willing to continue, but only a small number voted to proceed. Two companies had already decided to turn back, and Lewis himself was finally forced to make the decision to abandon the campaign and return home. Preston's diary ends with:

"Then Major Lewis stepped off some yards, and desired all who were willing to serve their country and share his fate, to go with him. All the officers, and some of the privates, not above twenty or thirty, joined him; upon which Montgomery's volunteers marched off, and were immediately followed by Capt. Preston's company, except the Captain, his two Lieutenants, and four privates...Major Lewis spoke to old Outacité, who appeared much grieved to see the men desert in such a manner, and said he was willing to proceed; but some of the warriors and young men were yet behind, and he was doubtful of them...The old chief added, that the white men could not bear abstinence like the Indians who would not complain of hunger."

=== Return home ===
Alexander Scott Withers (using material from Hugh Paul Taylor) says that on the way home, the troops were attacked by Shawnee warriors on 15 March and two soldiers were killed. A Shawnee warrior was taken prisoner. Lieutenant Alexander McNutt then proposed that they proceed to Lower Shawneetown and complete their mission, in hopes of capturing the town and getting food there, but Major Lewis decided to continue home. Thomas Lloyd, the surgeon, later wrote that they had to kill almost all their pack horses for food and at one point were forced to eat boiled leather and "tugs" of buffalo hide. The Tug Fork reportedly took its name from this.

Major Lewis arrived in Winchester, Virginia on 6 April, 1756, having ridden ahead on one of the last surviving horses. The troops arrived on 7 April and later returned to Fort Frederick.

== Aftermath ==
=== Analysis of the expedition ===
In his diary, Lieutenant Thomas Morton noted:

"Major Lewis's party suffered greatly on this expedition. The rivers were so much swoln by rains and melting snow that they were unable to reach the Shawanese town, and after six weeks in the woods, having lost several Canoes with provisions and ammunition, they were reduced nearly to a state of starvation, and obliged to kill their horses for food."

In a report to the Virginia Council dated 6 April, 1756, Major Lewis listed the main causes of the expedition's failure:

"...their ignorance of the Road and the licentious Behavior of the soldiers under the different ranging Captains and want of Provisions, that bad weather, high waters, and scarcity of Game caused them to labor under many Difficulties which they did not expect; and the volunteer mutinying."

On 7 April, George Washington wrote to Dinwiddie:

"I doubt not but your honor has had a particular account of Maj. Lewis's unsuccessful attempt to get to the Shawanese town. It was an expedition from which, on account of the length of the march, I always had little hope, and often expressed my apprehensions."

On 13 April, Governor Dinwiddie wrote to Washington: "Maj'r Lewis and his Men are ret'd, hav'g done nothing essential. I believe they did not know the way to the Shawnesse Towns."

Major Lewis was subsequently cleared of any fault in the expedition's failure. On 15 April, 1756, the journal of the Virginia House of Burgesses reads:

"Resolved, That Major Andrew Lewis, who commanded the Expedition, hath discharged his Duty with Integrity and Resolution, and that the ill Success thereof was entirely owing to the refractory and mutinous Behaviour of Captain Obediah Woodson, John Smith, and John Montgomery, who commanded the Volunteers."

=== Long-term impact ===
Word of the expedition evidently reached Lower Shawneetown, and a defensive force consisting of "1,000 Indians and six French officers" arrived at the town on 9 May, 1756, where it was observed by Samuel Stalnaker, who was still in captivity. He escaped the next day and went to Williamsburg to inform Governor Dinwiddie. In late 1758, Lower Shawneetown was moved upriver to the Pickaway Plains because the Shawnees were, in George Croghan's words, in "fear of the Virginians."

The expedition's failure led the Virginia government to reconsider how they might defend the colony from further attacks. Additional trade treaties with local Native American tribes were proposed as an incentive to peace. The House of Burgesses debated on the construction of a series of forts across the frontier, a strategy that was being implemented in Pennsylvania. Washington begged for funds to establish a professional standing army, saying that forts without soldiers would offer little protection. On 27 July 1756, Colonel John Buchanan presided over a council of war, held at the Augusta County Courthouse, "to meet and consult on the most proper places to build forts along the fronteers for the protection of the Inhabitants." The council decided on the locations of fifteen forts to be built in a "chain" across the county. The council determined that 680 men would need to be recruited to man these and several other existing forts. Samuel Stalnaker represented the Holston Settlement and recommended that stockade forts be built at Dunkard's Bottom on the New River and Davis' Bottom at the middle fork of the Holston River.

A second Sandy Creek expedition was planned in early 1757, and Captain Samuel Stalnaker was going to participate, but the plan was never implemented. In late 1757, Ephraim Vause attempted to organize a military expedition against the Shawnee, to rescue the prisoners taken after the capture of Fort Vause in June 1756. A number of men known as "The Associators" volunteered for this proposed expedition, and a total of 300 troops were expected to join. John Madison and the Augusta County Militia offered their support, and food and other supplies were obtained. Early in 1758, however, plans for the expedition were abandoned due to constant disputes among the commanding officers. On 3 April 1758, Captain John Smith submitted a proposal to the Virginia House of Burgesses offering to lead another expedition against the Shawnee, but no action was taken.

Lieutenant Alexander McNutt was highly critical of Major Lewis in his journal, which was handed over to Francis Fauquier soon after the expedition. Lewis was outraged, and on meeting with McNutt in 1757, by accident in the streets of Staunton, Virginia, Lewis attacked him.

The Sandy Creek Expedition served as valuable experience for Andrew Lewis, his cousin William Preston, William Ingles, and others who would defend Virginia during the French and Indian War and in the American Revolution. William Preston continued to lead Preston's Rangers. Seventy men served under him during 1757, including two lieutenants, two sergeants (one of whom was his servant, Thomas Lloyd) and two corporals. The unit was disbanded in May, 1759.

=== Relations with the Cherokee ===
The campaign led to closer ties between the Cherokee people and the Virginia colonial government. In late June 1756, in fulfillment of Governor Dinwiddie's promise, Andrew Lewis built a small fort on the Little Tennessee River near the Cherokee town of Chota in Tennessee. This fort was replaced a few months later by the construction of the much larger Fort Loudoun. On 5 June, 1757, Cherokee warriors defending Fort Cumberland on the Maryland-Virginia border captured the French officer François-Marie Picoté de Belestre, who had been leading raids against English settlements, including one in which Fort Vause was destroyed. Virginia militiamen and other colonial troops continued to receive instruction from the Cherokee on woodcraft, reconnaissance, and combat. Ostenaco led Cherokee warriors on raids against French troops in and around Fort Duquesne throughout 1757 and 1758.

== Sources ==
Four primary sources describing the expedition exist: the diary of Captain William Preston, published in 1906, a fragment of Lieutenant Thomas Morton's diary, found after his death and published in 1851, and a letter from Thomas Lloyd (Preston's indentured servant and one of two surgeons on the expedition, together with William Fleming), written to a friend in October, 1756. On 6 April, 1756, Andrew Lewis submitted a report to the Virginia Council describing the expedition. There are also some references to the expedition in the correspondence of Governor Dinwiddie and George Washington.

Alexander Scott Withers states that "a journal of this campaign was kept by Lieut. Alexander McNutt...On his return to Williamsburg he presented it to [Lieutenant-]Governor Francis Fauquier by whom it was deposited in the executive archives," but it appears to have been lost. Withers' account of the expedition, which has a number of significant errors, seems to have been partly based on Hugh Paul Taylor's Historical Sketches of the Internal Improvements of Virginia (1825, now lost) and on an article Taylor published under the pseudonym "Son of Cornstalk" in the Fincastle Mirror on 8 August, 1829, which may have used McNutt's journal as a source.

== Memorialization ==
In 2015 a driving tour following the route of the Sandy Creek Expedition was developed by Trails, Inc. The route starts on the Virginia-West Virginia border and passes through Vallscreek to Canebrake, Berwind, and into the Berwind Wildlife Management Area to Excelsior, Raysal, and Wyoming City, finishing at Wharncliffe. The tour includes ten points of interest as well as campsites.

== See also ==
- Andrew Lewis (soldier)
- William Preston (Virginia soldier)
- Alexander McNutt (colonist)
- Richard Pearis
- Ostenaco
