= Benjamin Rush Floyd =

American lawyer and politician (1811–1860)

Benjamin Rush Floyd (December 10, 1811 – February 15, 1860) was an American lawyer and politician.

Floyd was born in Montgomery County, Virginia, His brother was John B. Floyd, Governor of Virginia. Floyd went to Georgetown University in Washington, D.C. and practiced law in Wytheville, Virginia. Floyd served in the Virginia House of Delegates in 1847 and 1848 and in the Virginia Senate in 1857 and 1858. Floyd served in the Virginia Constitutional Convention of 1850-1851. Floyd died suddenly from a heart attack in Washington, D.C. He was packing at the time to leave for Richmond, Virginia to attend the Democratic Party Convention.
