= William Preston (Virginia soldier) =

Irish-born American military officer, planter and politician (1729–1783)

Member of the Virginia House of Burgesses from Botetourt County
- In office 1769–1771 Serving with John Bowyer
- Preceded by: position created
- Succeeded by: Andrew Lewis

Member of the Virginia House of Burgesses from Augusta County
- In office 1766–1769 Serving with John Wilson
- Preceded by: Israel Christian
- Succeeded by: Gabriel Jones

Personal details
- Born: December 25, 1729 Limavady, Ireland
- Died: June 28, 1783 (aged 53) Price's Fork, Montgomery County, Virginia
- Resting place: Smithfield Plantation
- Spouse: Susanna Smith
- Occupation: surveyor, officer, planter, politician

Military service
- Allegiance: United Colonies
- Branch/service: Virginia militia
- Years of service: 1765–1781
- Rank: Colonel
- Battles/wars: Draper's Meadow massacre Sandy Creek Expedition; Lord Dunmore's War; American Revolutionary War; Battle of Guilford Courthouse

Colonel William Preston (December 25, 1729 – June 28, 1783) was an Irish-born American military officer, planter and politician who founded a political dynasty. After service in the French and Indian War, Preston served five years in the House of Burgesses before becoming one of the fifteen signatories of the Fincastle Resolutions, then a colonel in the Virginia militia during the American Revolutionary War. His descendants became leaders in the American South for nearly a century and played crucial roles in developing the Southern Colonies under plantations operating using slaves. Preston also supported education, as would his descendants. He was a founding trustee of Liberty Hall when it was transformed into a college in 1776. His son, Virginia governor James Patton Preston, helped charter the University of Virginia roughly five decades later. His grandson, Congressman William Ballard Preston founded Olin and Preston Institute, which was in financial difficulties by 1872, when another grandson, former CSA Col. James Preston, sold three plantations (including Smithfield Plantation which this man purchased in 1773 and made his main home), to the Commonwealth of Virginia to become the Virginia Agricultural and Mechanical College, which is now the campus of Virginia Tech in Blacksburg, Virginia.

== Early life, emigration and education ==
William Preston was born on Christmas Day in 1729, in Limavady, County Londonderry, Ireland, to ship carpenter John Preston and his wife, Elizabeth. Their first born son, he ultimately had four sisters who married (Letitia married Robert Breckinridge, Margaret married John Brown, Ann married Francis Smith and Mary married John Howard), and one of his younger brothers, William also reached adulthood (marrying Susanna Smith). The youngest brother, James, died as a boy. Elizabeth's father, Henry Patton, was a prominent shipwright and merchant, and his son (this man's uncle) James Patton served in the Royal Navy. In 1737 James Patton and his Virginia partner, Col. William Beverley, had secured the right to develop 30,000 acres in then-huge Orange County (in the part that became still-vast Augusta County in 1745) from Edward Barradall and John Lewis. Patton promised that if John Preston traveled to America and served as a ship-wright, he would received 4,000 acres of land, so John Preston, his wife, son and three daughters sailed to Virginia upon the 'Walpole' in 1738. The Prestons settled about eight miles south of what became Staunton, and John Preston operated an ordinary, as well as employed indentured workers on road contracts with the local government. Although John Preston became estranged from Patton before his death in the winter of 1747–1748 (before this man reached legal age), his widow moved into Staunton and helped her brother with his bookkeeping and other activities, as well as helped establish the Tinkling Spring Presbyterian Church. Meanwhile, William received a rudimentary education appropriate to his class, including with Rev. John Craig, pastor of the Tinkling Spring Presbyterian Church.

Ultimately, the Crown granted Patton's partners between 100,000 and 120,000 acres in America to permit British colonization beyond the Blue Ridge Mountains. However, after this man reached legal age (and after his first military service described below), the treaty ending the French and Indian War led to the Royal Proclamation of 1763, reversing British policy and limiting the family's grants, although Prestonsburg, Kentucky would ultimately named in John's or this man's honor.

== Personal life and distinguishing contemporary professor ==
William Preston married Susanna Smith (1740–1823) on January 17, 1761. Her father was Francis Smith who had emigrated from Hanover County. She bore 12 children and would survive him by four decades. Somewhat complicating matters, although this man appears nearly self-educated and no relation, a contemporary of the time was Rev. William Preston (d. 1778), who had been born in Westmoreland County in England before graduating from Queen's College of Oxford University and who emigrated to Virginia in 1752 to become professor of moral philosophy at the College of William and Mary and minister of James City Parish in 1755. He married Mary Tyler, daughter of John Tyler of James City (Williamsburg), but resigned in 1757 to return to England where he became rector of Ormside.

== Career ==
=== From surveyor to military officer ===
Preston began his public career in 1750 when he became clerk of the vestry of Augusta Parish, a post he would hold for 16 years. He would also lead troops in both the French and Indian War and American Revolutionary War, but his military career began a decade earlier as a diplomat and surveyor. In June 1752, William accompanied his uncle James Patton during negotiations to acquire land from native American tribes, and served as his secretary at the Logstown Treaty Conference. Patton soon arranged for his nephew to be apprenticed to Thomas Lewis, the surveyor the Augusta county surveyor and Patton's cousin, so in November 1752, William became a deputy surveyor. He later served as surveyor in Augusta, Botetourt, Fincastle, and Montgomery Counties, in particular surveying 36 tracts for Patton along the New River. Preston would later serve as county lieutenant for Fincastle County (much of which became Kentucky about a decade after this man's death) and Montgomery Counties (part of which later became West Virginia decades later), after the Virginia legislature further split Augusta County after the Botetourt County spinoff discussed below as its population continued to increase. In that era, the county lieutenant was the county's chief executive, appointed by the justices of the peace who were also responsible for the county administration, including overall governance of the county militia, in which all white men were required to serve.

In July 1755, Preston was commissioned captain of a ranger company, and served under his uncle James Patton until Patton was killed, then under Maj. Andrew Lewis of the Virginia Regiment. Preston survived the Draper's Meadow massacre, an attack by the Shawnee against a settlement that was part of a property later known as Smithfield Plantation, that he purchased in 1773. About a year later, Preston constructed his Smithfield Plantation home, which became his main residence.

Preston was a captain with the Virginia Regiment on the Sandy Creek Expedition in 1756. This expedition to one of the tributaries of the Clinch River failed to locate any enemies, and the insufficient food supply for the troops led to a virtual mutiny. His journal is now the only complete record of that campaign. Preston was also responsible for erecting Fort William near one of the mountain passes to protect settlers, and in early October 1756 he accompanied George Washington from Augusta Court House to the James River at Col. John Buchanan's at Luney's Ferry during Washington's survey of the frontier before taking drafted militia to relieve the company at Millar's Fort in November. In 1757 and 1758, he commanded troops at Fort Prince George in the Bullpasture area, before being qualified as major of the Augusta County militia on November 17, 1758. Despite that rank, he was captain of a ranger company stationed at Fort Young in 1759, then commissioned lieutenant colonel of the militia on August 17, 1759.

During Lord Dunmore's War of 1773–1774, while fighting against the Shawnee Indians, Preston urged Virginians to join the militia to enact revenge on the Indians and plunder their stock of horses. As the county lieutenant, one of Col. Preston's greatest contributions to the American Revolutionary War was his ability to suppress the Tories (British loyalists) from uprising in then-vast southwest Virginia during the Revolution. He also helped fight Lord Cornwallis and the British in the Carolinas.

=== Planter ===
Although as firstborn son, he probably inherited land from his father when he reached legal age, his mother lived with him as well as supervised that estate, so that documentation is scarce. In March 1749/50 Preston purchased two parcels of land totaling about 700 acres from William Beverly and an additional 277 acres from James and Agnes Brown, and used his job as deputy surveyor to locate further good land. In February 1759, Preston purchased 191 acres on Buffalo Creek near the headwaters of the James River which had a block house or fort surrounded by a stockade. It became the core of Greenfield plantation where Preston moved his family by 1762. In August 1759, Preston traveled to Nanjemoy, Maryland and purchased 16 enslaved Africans from the ship True Blue for 752pounds (to avoid a 5% Virginia sales tax). Greenfield contained 1590 acres by 1765 and 2175 acres by the time of Preston's death, when it was one of Botetourt County's largest plantations.

However, in 1774, Preston moved his family to Smithfield Plantation, in present-day Blacksburg, Virginia (the Montgomery County seat), and it served as his final home. At least 216 people were enslaved as workers at the Smithfield Plantation.

=== Politician ===
Preston became one of the justices of the peace comprising the Augusta County Court on March 21, 1755, but his first attempt at legislative office (as burgess) failed that December. However, Augusta County voters elected Preston as one of their two representative to Virginia colony's House of Burgesses in 1765 and he served from 1766 until 1769 when the legislature accepted resident's suggestion from 1765 and divided the vast county, creating nearly as vast Botetourt County from its southern portion (the drainage of the Roanoke and other mountain streams), after which Preston became one of the first two burgesses elected from Botetourt County. Preston may have arranged a second split before his departure, as Botetourt County split in 1772, with the area west of the New and Kanawha Rivers becoming Fincastle County, although the Botetourt County seat would remain at a new town created that year and named Fincastle. In 1775, Preston was one of the signatories of the Fincastle Resolutions, one of the early resolves in the increasingly divisive relation with England. By 1775, some western Virginians had proposed splitting still-vast Fincastle county, and it disappeared in 1777, with the westernmost portion becoming Kentucky County and the mountainous eastern half became still large Montgomery County (from which southern West Virginia would later be formed) as well as Washington County. Botetourt County would also be further split after Preston's political life ended, with the creation of Rockbridge County (1778), Bath County (1791, after this man's death), Alleghany County (1822), Roanoke County (1833), and Craig County (1851).

Preston served as a founding trustee of Liberty Hall (chartered in 1782), formerly named the Augusta Academy, when in 1776 it was renamed in a burst of revolutionary fervor and moved to Lexington, Virginia (shortly before the formation of Rockbridge County). Other founding trustees Preston worked with were prominent men in the area, including Andrew Lewis, Thomas Lewis, Samuel McDowell, Sampson Mathews, George Moffett, and James Waddel. It is the ninth-oldest institution of higher education in the country.

== Death and legacy ==
Preston collapsed during a late June 1783 military muster near Price's Fork in Montgomery County, and days later died in a house to which he was taken. Given the limited medical diagnoses of the day, he may have suffered a heat stroke or a heart attack followed by a stroke. His remains were interred at the family cemetery near Smithfield Plantation. His final home, Smithfield Plantation, now restored and listed on the U.S. Historical Registry, is open for tours from April through the first week in December. The Preston family papers are held by several institutions including: at Wytheville Community College, Virginia Tech, and Duke University, as well as the Swem library of the College of William and Mary,

Many prominent Americans descended from Preston and his wife Susanna, for whom he had named Smithfield plantation. His firstborn son and principal heir John Preston had served under his father in the militia, and would first represent Montgomery County in the Virginia House of Delegates in 1783 as well as serve in the Virginia Senate and as the state Treasurer. His brother Francis Preston would also serve in both houses of the Virginia General Assembly as well as the U.S. House of Representatives. William and Susanna thus were parents or grandparents to governors, senators, congressmen, presidential cabinet members, university founders, university presidents, and military leaders. The Prestons' son James Patton Preston was governor of Virginia from 1816 to 1819 and helped charter the University of Virginia. Their grandson William Ballard Preston was a congressman, Secretary of the Navy under Zachary Taylor, and later a senator from the Confederate States of America. William Ballard Preston also offered the Ordinance of Secession to the Virginia Legislature that resulted in Virginia joining the Confederacy, and he co-founded a small Methodist college, the Olin and Preston Institute, which was in financial difficulty by 1872. The trustees relinquished its charter and donated its property to the state, which reorganized the campus as the Virginia Agricultural and Mechanical College. Today, it is known as Virginia Tech. Two other grandsons born at Smithfield were became Virginia governors were John Buchanan Floyd and John Floyd, Jr.

Preston was memorialized on July 27, 2011, with the Colonel William Preston highway in Blacksburg, Virginia.

The city of Prestonville, Kentucky, was erected on one of his land grants and named in his honor. Before 1800, it was the most important town in the county and larger than Port William. One of the first roads built in this section of the state was from the mouth of the Kentucky to New Castle in Henry County.

== See also ==
- William Preston (poet)
- Thomas Preston, 1st Viscount Tara
