= Huckleberry Trail =

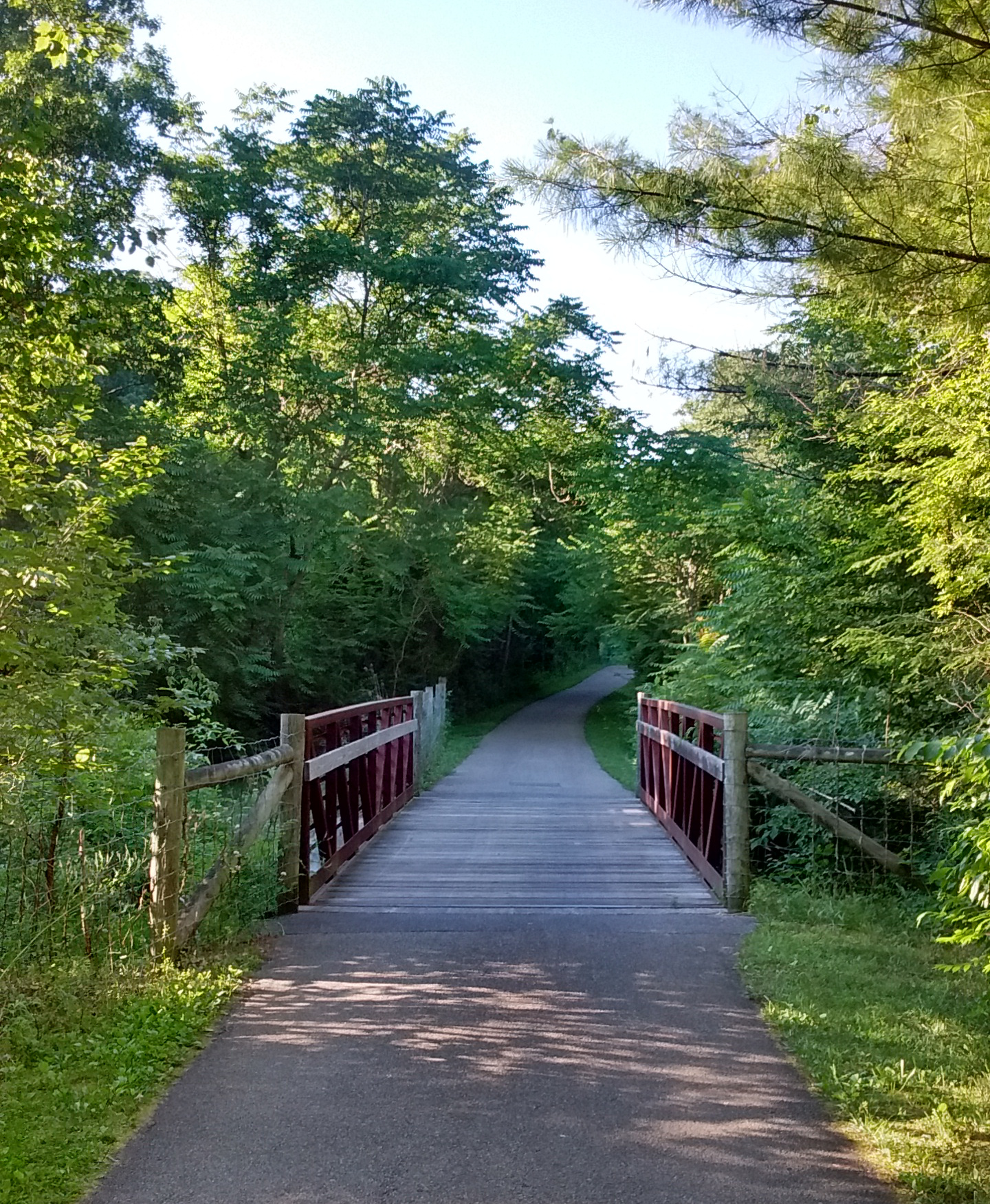
- Huckleberry Trail, bridge over Slate Branch near Merrimac, Virginia
- Length: 15 mi (24 km)
- Location: Montgomery County, Virginia
- Designation: Community Millennium Trail
- Use: Hiking, bicycling, etc.
- Difficulty: Moderate
- Season: Year-round
- Sights: Alleghany Mountains; Virginia Tech

The Huckleberry Trail is a multipurpose trail that measures almost 15 miles (24 km) in length in Montgomery County, Virginia, connecting the towns of Blacksburg and Christiansburg. The trail is 12 feet (3.7 m) wide with an asphalt surface.

The trail takes its name from the former rail alignment used by the Virginia Anthracite Coal and Railway Company. Nicknamed the "Huckleberry," the moniker was introduced by the railroad's passengers, who would pick huckleberries alongside the tracks during the railroad's frequent service interruptions and breakdowns.

== History ==
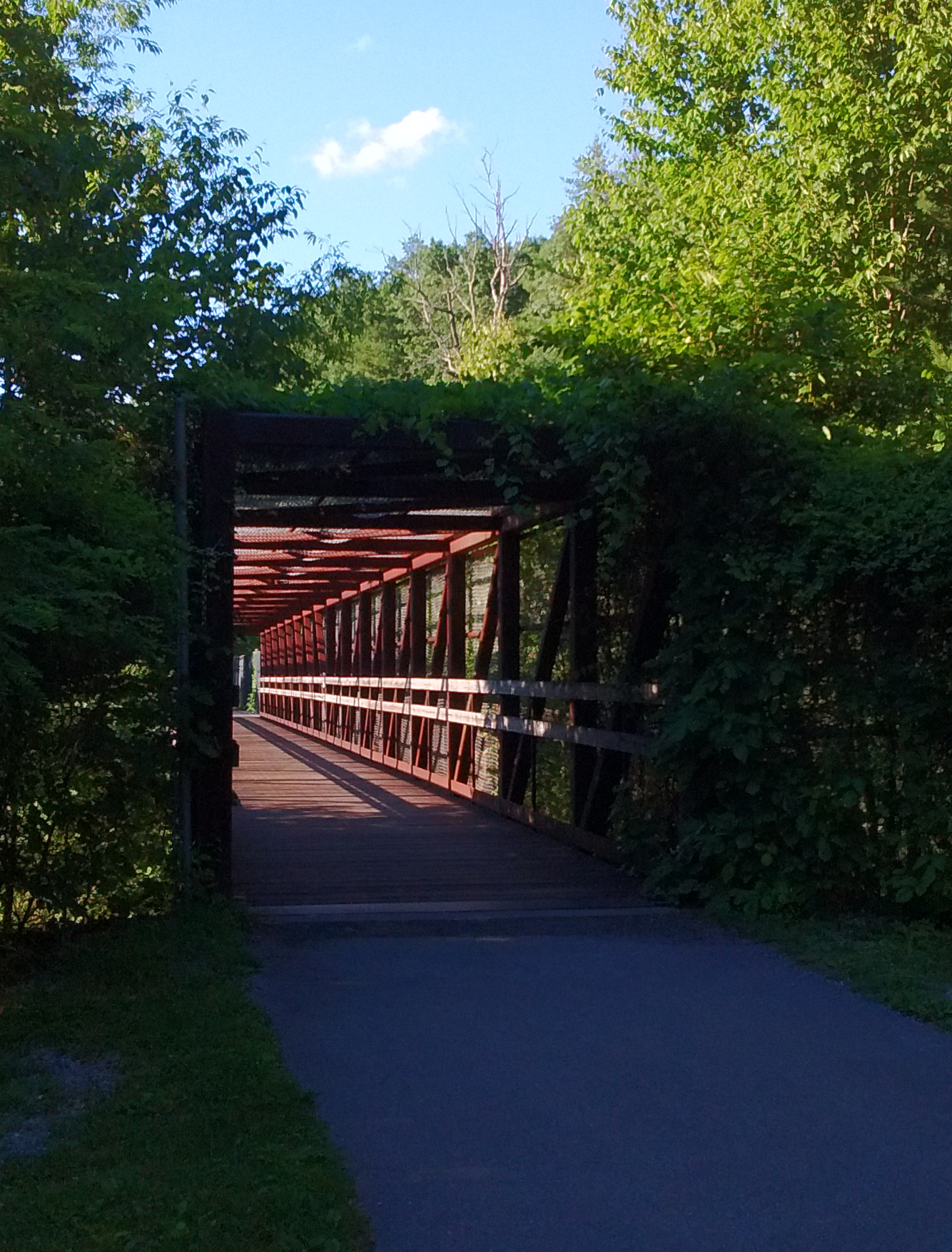
Huckleberry Trail bridge over the Norfolk Southern operated railway owned by the Virginia Passenger Rail Authority

With passenger service ending in 1958 and the subsequent abandonment of the line in 1967, the former railroad right-of-way remained unused until the idea of its conversion to a pedestrian trail arose in the 1980s. In February 1990, Montgomery County approved what would be named the Huckleberry Trail as the county's first bikeway.

In July 1991, Friends of the Huckleberry, a non-profit organization was formed to work with local governments to fundraise, acquire land, and construct the trail. After a successful grassroots fundraising campaign for the trail's construction, in October 1993 the Commonwealth Transportation Board awarded the Huckleberry project $453,424 towards its construction.

Originally scheduled to commence construction in early 1994, delays resulting from ADA accessibility and prehistoric archaeological sites along the trail's path resulted in some adjustments to its route. Additionally, higher costs from the construction of a tunnel and enhanced emergency vehicle access caused the project to run out of its initial funds and be placed on hold. After these delays and the securing of additional funding, construction began on the initial 3.2-mile (5.1 km) segment between the Montgomery-Floyd Regional Library in Blacksburg and the intersection of Hightop and Merrimac Roads in Merrimac on April 5, 1996. Although the trail was used by the public before this date, it officially opened in a ribbon-cutting ceremony on December 7, 1996.

Immediately following the completion of the initial phase, bidding for the construction of the second phase began with an initial completion date estimated for late 1997. However, estimated costs for the completion of the second segment came in well over budget, resulting in the project being pushed back until additional funding could be secured. With Blacksburg, Christiansburg and Montgomery County all contributing additional funding, construction of the second phase was completed in late 1998, with the ribbon-cutting ceremony occurring on December 1, 1998. The completed trail cost $1.4 million, with federal transportation grants covering about $690,000 of the total cost.

On June 1, 2000, the Huckleberry Trail's success was recognized by the federal government when it was named one of the nation's 2,000 Community Millennium Trails.

On June 29, 2015, the Huckleberry Trail's Renva Knowles Bridge opened, crossing over Peppers Ferry Road near the New River Valley Mall, and the path was extended south to Cambria Street in Christiansburg, with a spur connecting the Huckleberry Trail to the Christiansburg Recreation Center via Cambria Street and North Franklin Street.

In 2016-2017, the section of the Huckleberry Trail between the Virginia Tech Montgomery Executive Airport and Route 460 was realigned in connection with the Southgate Connector project, which realigned the road between Virginia Tech and Route 460. The new alignment provided a more direct connection between Huckleberry Trail and the Virginia Tech campus.

On June 20, 2019, a section extending to Blacksburg's Heritage Community Park and Gateway Trail was completed. Gateway Trail connects to trail system in the George Washington and Jefferson National Forests. With this connection, the Huckleberry Trail is part of a paved and natural surface trail network that is approaching 60 miles in length.

Friends of the Huckleberry continues to work with local governments and private partners to raise funds to continue expanding the trail.

== Route description ==
The Huckleberry Trail consists of three segments. The original portion of the Huckleberry Trail runs between downtown Blacksburg and Christiansburg. Once the original section was completed, the trail was expanded and now consists of the original portion and two additional segments known as Huckleberry North and Huckleberry South. Together, the three segments are almost 15 miles (24 km) in length.

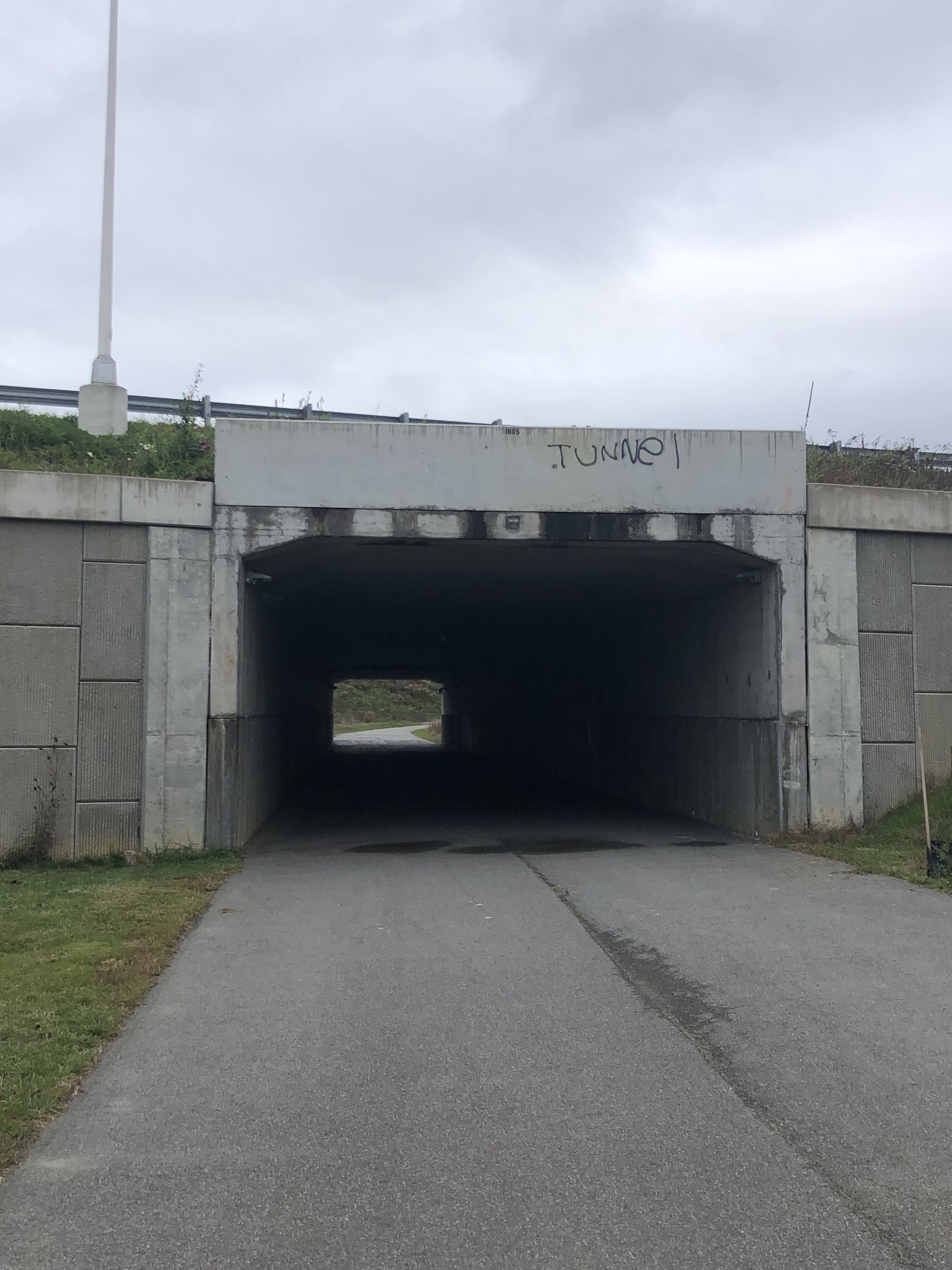
Underpass crossing Route 460 alongside the Huckleberry Trail

The original Huckleberry Trail starts in downtown Blacksburg on Draper Road at the Montgomery-Floyd Regional Library. The trail heads south, crossing Southgate Drive, and continuing until it reaches the edge of the Virginia Tech Montgomery Executive Airport. From there, the trail heads north back to Southgate Drive and the Virginia Tech campus, then runs southwest through an underpass to a traffic circle at Route 460.

From the traffic circle west of Route 460, the main Huckleberry Trail parallels Route 460 and runs southeast to the Slate Branch of Stroubles Creek, then follows Slate Branch south to the unincorporated community of Merrimac. The trail crosses Merrimac Road and passes through the Coal Mining Heritage Park. Continuing south, it crosses over the Norfolk Southern Railway operated railway owned by the Virginia Passenger Railway Authority, enters a road cut, and passes behind the New River Valley Mall. It crosses Peppers Ferry Road on the Renva Knowles Bridge and continues along Cambria Street and North Franklin Street to the Christiansburg Recreation Center.

Before the terminus at the Christiansburg Recreation Center, at the intersection of Providence Boulevard, a one-mile segment heads south towards the Christiansburg High School. This segment is identified as "Huckleberry South."

From the traffic circle west of Route 460, Huckleberry North heads northeast through the Hethwood neighborhood, crosses Prices Fork Road, and then continues north to Glade Road. North of Glade Road, it enters Heritage Community Park, which is a former farm. Paths through the park connect the Huckleberry Trail to Gateway Trail and the George Washington Jefferson National Forest.

== Coal Mining Heritage Park ==
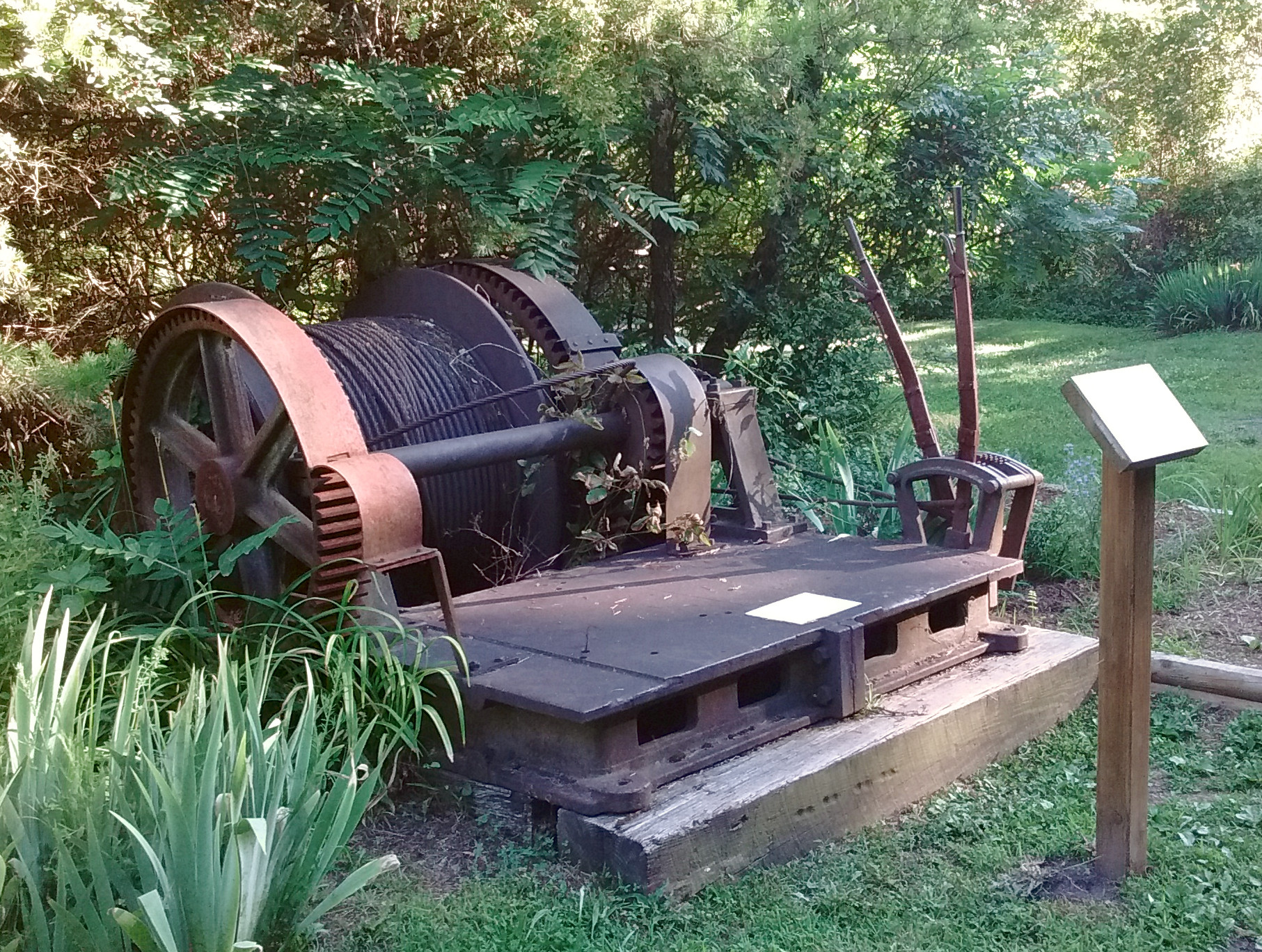
Old mining equipment at the Coal Mining Heritage Park

Near the village of Merrimac, the Huckleberry Trail passes through the 29.2-acre (11.8 ha) Coal Mining Heritage Park, which features equipment and part of the foundations of an abandoned coal mine. The park is located on the site of the former Merrimac Mine, which closed in the 1930s. In addition to the coal mine, the site formerly hosted a coal tipple, a hotel, a general store, and residential housing for the miners. The Coal Mining Heritage Park was planned by a collaboration between the Anthropology Program at Radford University, the Montgomery County Planning Office, the Coal Mining Heritage Association of Montgomery County, and the Virginia Department of Historic Resources. It officially opened on September 9, 2000. Located within the park is the Coal Mining Loop Trail, a 1.5-mile (2.4 km) path which opened on November 17, 2010.
