= Virginia Tech Corporate Research Center =

Science park in Blacksburg, Virginia

Coordinates: 37.204°N 80.412°W

The Virginia Tech Corporate Research Center, known locally as the 'Corporate Research Center' or the 'CRC' or 'VTCRC', is a science park next to the Virginia Tech campus in Blacksburg, Virginia The VTCRC encompasses approximately 230 acres and includes 40 buildings. It is located adjacent to the Virginia Tech Airport.

== Companies located in the CRC ==
The CRC currently has over 230 tenants including technology, research and support companies.

== See also ==
- Virginia Polytechnic Institute and State University
- Virginia Tech § Virginia Tech Foundation
- System X (supercomputer)
- Virginia Tech Foundation
