= Crockford =

Crockford, Crockfords or Crockford's may refer to:

== People ==
- Alex Crockford, a Harry Potter cast member
- Beryl Crockford (1950–2016), British rower
- Douglas Crockford (born 1953), American entrepreneur and JavaScript language developer
- Eric Crockford (1888–1958), British field hockey player and cricketer
- Harold Crockford (1893–1983), English footballer
- John Crockford, a mid 19th century English book publisher
- Virginia Allen Crockford (1918–2001), American educationalist
- William Crockford (1775–1844), proprietor of Crockford's club, London, England

== Places ==
- Crockford's (club), a former gentlemen's club in London, England, founded by William Crockford
- Crockfords (casino), a casino in London, England

== Other uses ==
- Crockford's Clerical Directory, directory of the Anglican Communion in Britain and Ireland
