= Blacksburg Transit =

Urban-suburban bus line based in Blacksburg, Virginia, US

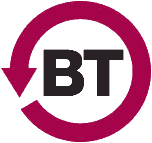

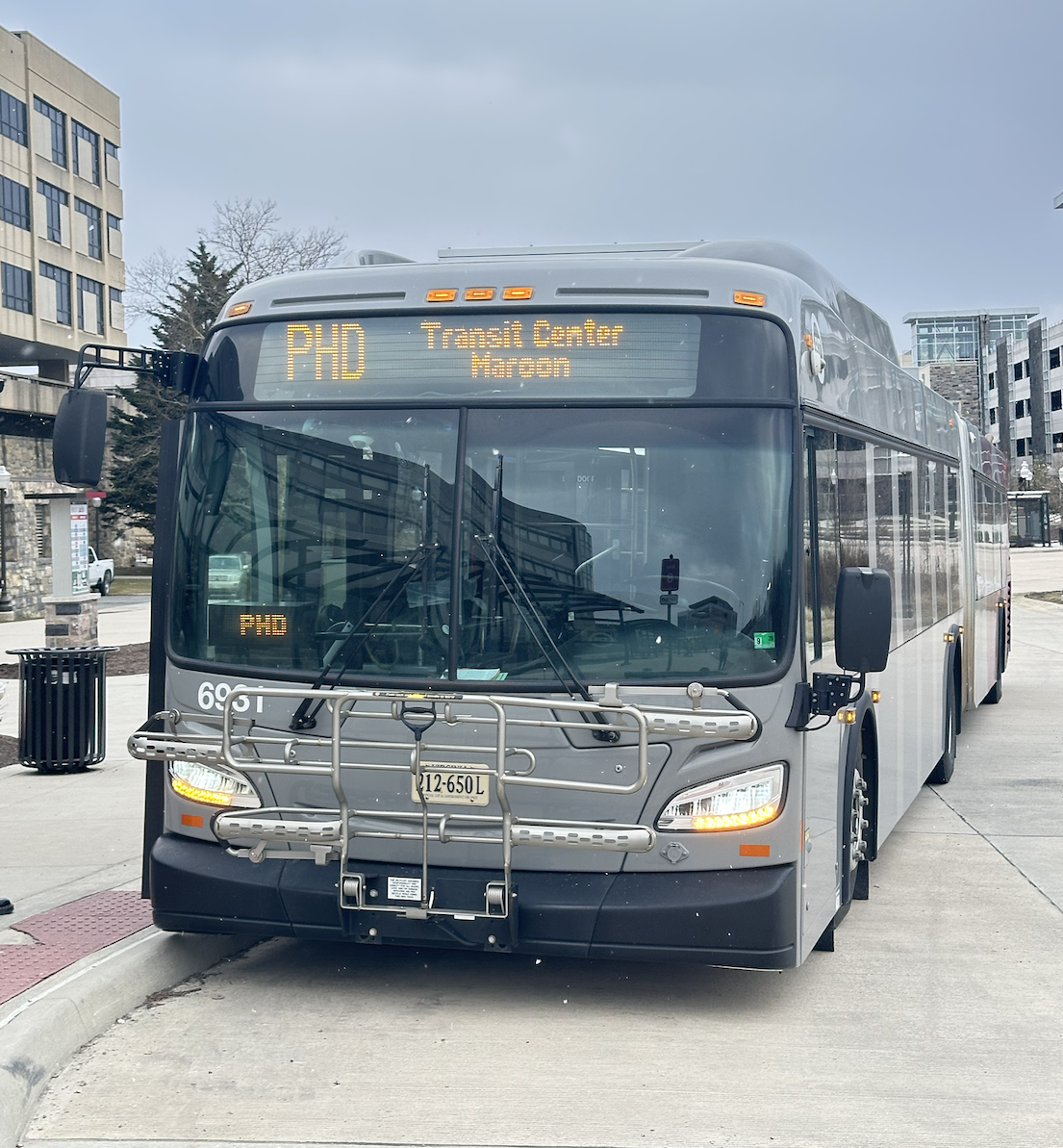
- A 60' New Flyer XD60 in the Maroon Loop on Virginia Tech's campus.
- Parent: Town of Blacksburg
- Founded: 1983
- Headquarters: 2800 Commerce Street
- Locale: Blacksburg, Virginia
- Service type: Fixed-Route Bus Service, Demand Response & Paratransit
- Routes: 19
- Fleet: 49 Active Transit Buses; 17 Paratransit vans
- Daily ridership: 19,700 (weekdays, Q1 2026)
- Annual ridership: 4,985,200 (2025)
- Director: Brian Booth
- Website: ridebt.org

Blacksburg Transit, or simply BT, is a local government-owned urban-suburban bus line based in Blacksburg, Virginia. The system originated in 1983 with six buses, but has since expanded its operation to 53 fixed-route buses and 18 body-on-chassis vehicles. In FY 19, Ridership exceeded 4.6 million passenger trips per year; ridership is dominated by Virginia Tech students who account for approximately 90 percent of all riders, with the remaining percentage being split between Virginia Tech faculty and staff, and other Blacksburg citizens. Ridership decreased in FY20 and FY21 due to COVID-19, but began rebounding in FY21. Blacksburg Transit serves the towns of Blacksburg, Christiansburg and limited portions of Montgomery County. Ridership in FY25 (July 1, 2024 through June 30, 2025) exceeded 4.7 million passenger trips, an increase of 26% over the previous fiscal year.

Service in Blacksburg was overhauled in 2024, moving the hub of service from Virginia Tech's Drillfield to the Loops at the new Transit Center. This major change increased route efficiency and typically due to the shortened route length provided increased frequency without adding additional vehicles. A new route, the Campus Shuttle (CAS), provides high frequency service around central campus. CAS accounted for 20% of all passenger trips in FY25.

== System of the Year ==
In 2019, BT was named the American Public Transportation Association's Outstanding Public Transportation System for agencies carrying fewer than 4 million passenger trips per year. BT was singled out for their successful delivery of service to Virginia Tech, Blacksburg and Christiansburg based on performance on 24 quantitative and qualitative criteria, including ridership. In the three years evaluated (2016, 2017 and 2018), BT experienced an unprecedented 22 percent growth in ridership from 3.5 to 4.3 million passenger trips per year.

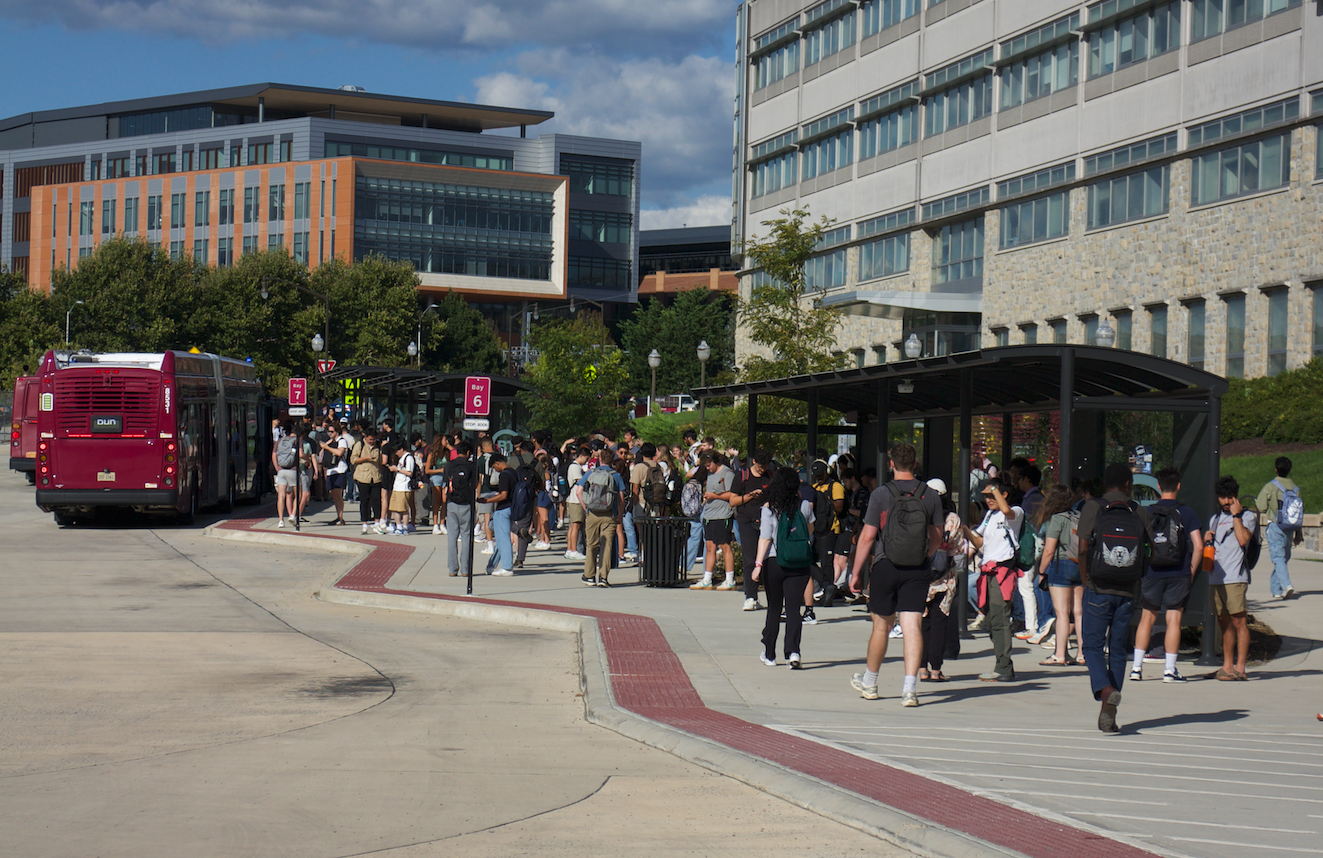
Maroon loop during class change in August 2025.

== Employees ==
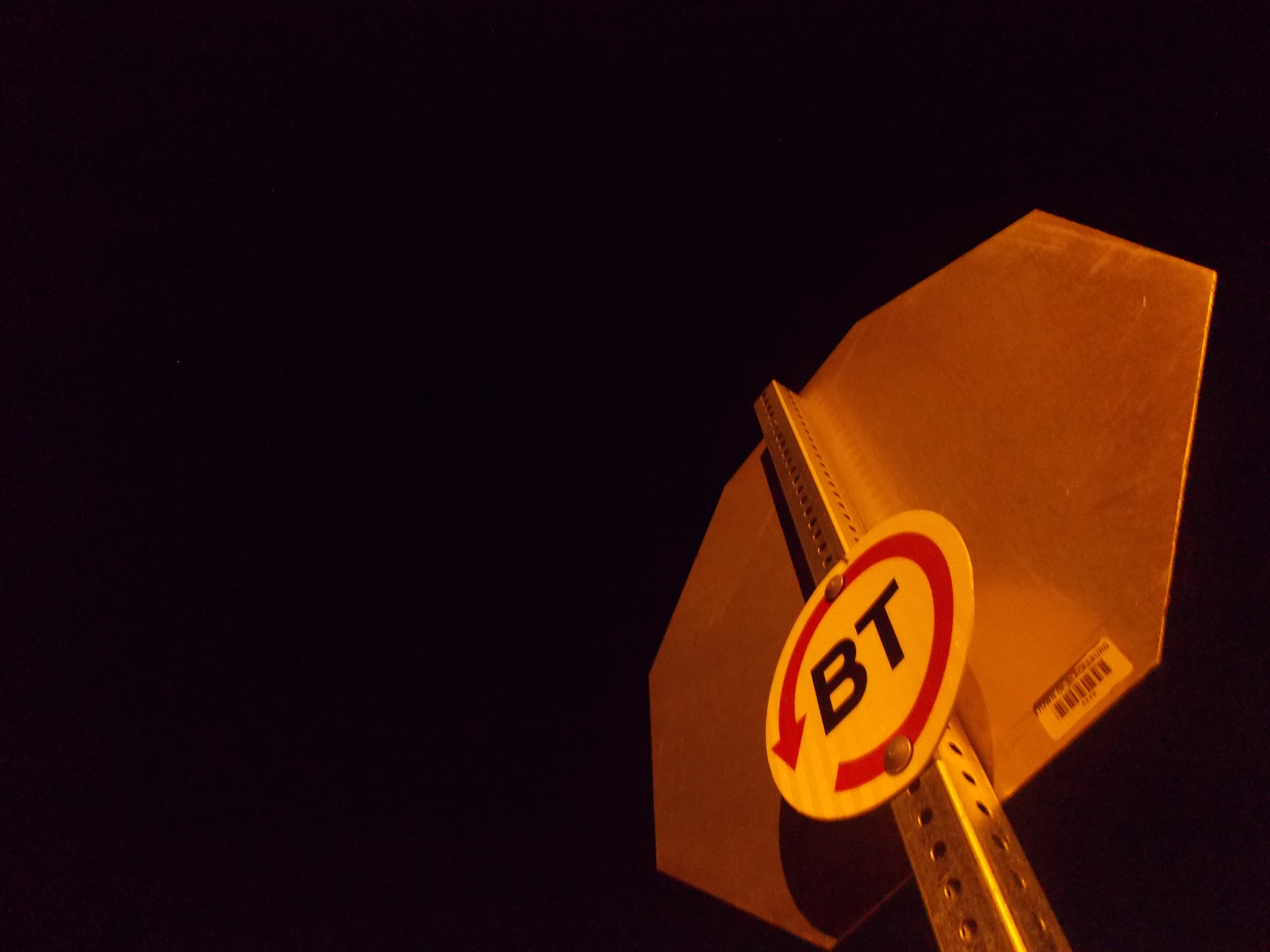
Blacksburg Transit sign

The majority of BT's drivers are part-time employees, making BT a popular employer with Virginia Tech students as well as retirees. The majority of the service's full-time staff consists of administrative and supervisory positions.

== BT Access ==
BT Access is Blacksburg Transit's complementary paratransit service. The service is available for persons with a temporary or permanent disability who meet the criteria established under the Americans with Disabilities Act. Once approved, riders can schedule one time or recurring trips with door-to-door service to any destination within Blacksburg. Riders wishing to go to Christiansburg can schedule a trip to meet the Two Town Trolley at the Loops or at LewisGale Hospital Montgomery.

== Routes ==
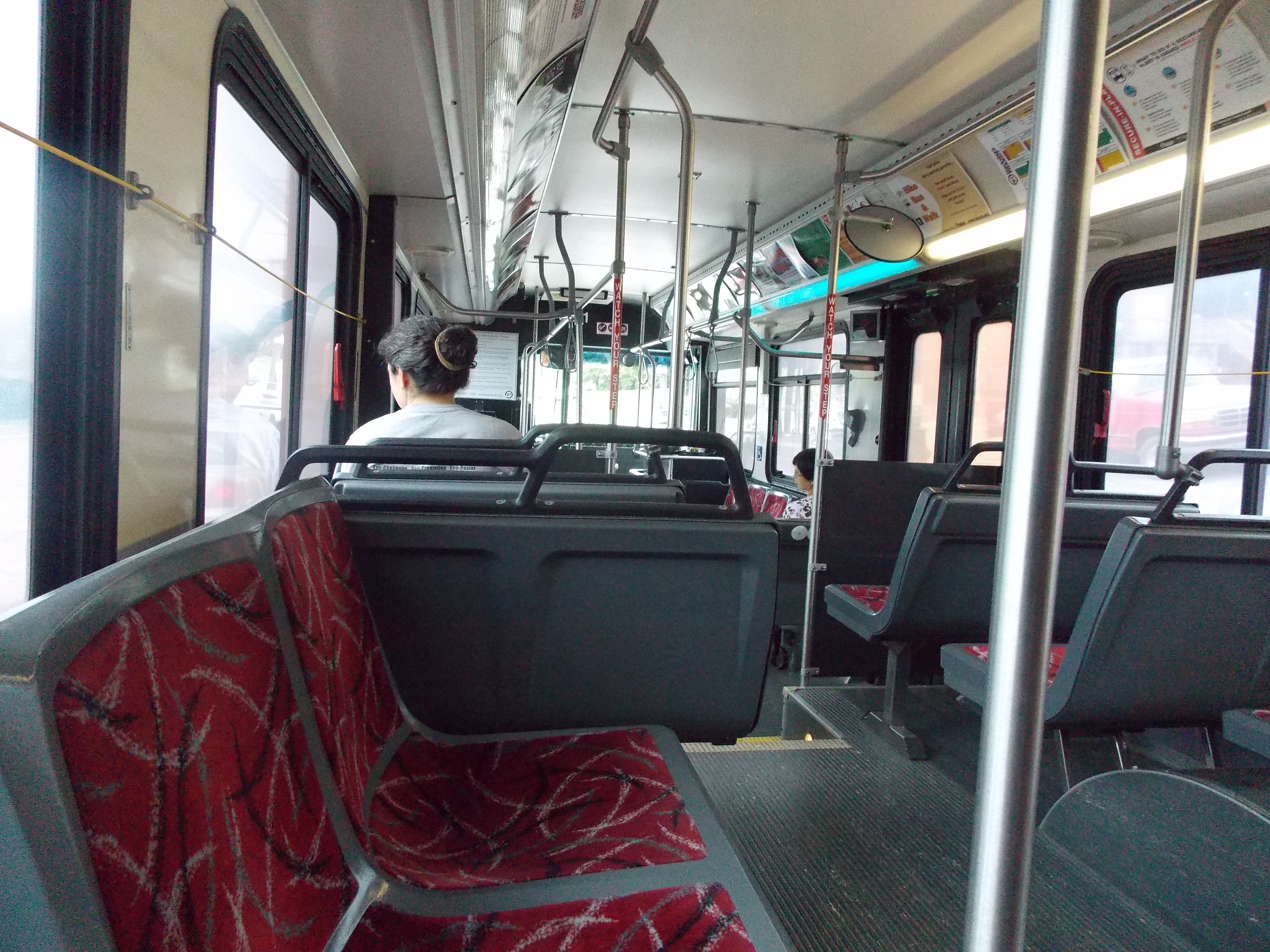
Inside a bus of Blacksburg Transit, Blacksburg, Virginia

=== Route schedules and maps ===
Blacksburg Service

- Beamer Way (BMR)
- Campus Shuttle (CAS)
- Carpenter Boulevard (CRB)
- Corporate Research Center Shuttle (CRC)
- Harding Avenue (HDG)
- Hethwood A (HWA)
- Hethwood B (HWB)
- Hethwood Combined (HWC)
- Hokie Express (HXP)
- Hokie Express via Stanger (HXS)
- North Main Givens (NMG)
- Patrick Henry B (PHB)
- Patrick Henry Drive (PHD)
- Progress Street (PRG)
- South Main Airport (SMA)
- South Main Ellett (SME)
- South Main Southpark (SMS)
- Toms Creek Progress (TCP)
- Toms Creek Road (TCR)
- Two Town Trolley Hospital (TTH)
- Two Town Trolley Spradlin Farms (TTS)
- University City Boulevard (UCB)

Christiansburg Service

- Explorer Blue (BLU)
- Explorer Green (GRN)
- Go Anywhere

==== Weekday route frequencies in minutes ====
Route Name	Reduced Service	Intermediate Service	Full Service (school in session)
CAS	15	15	7.5 (currently 15 due to bus shortage)
CRB	No Service	No Service	20
CRC	24	24	24
HDG	30	30	30, (15 between 8:30am and 2pm)
HWA	No Service	No Service	15
HWB	No Service	No Service	15
HWC	15	15	10, (15 after 6:30 pm)
HXP	30	30	30, (15 between 8:30am and 2pm)
NMG	30	15	15
BMR	30	30	30, (15 between 6:30 and 9:30am and 3:30 and 6:40pm)
PHB	No Service	No Service	12
PHD	30	30	15
PRG	No Service	No Service	12
SMA	30	30	30
SME	30	30 (after 9:45pm)	30 (after 9:45pm)
SMS	30	30	30
TCP	15	15	10, (15 after 6:30 pm)
TCR	No Service	No Service	12
TTT	60	60	60, (30 on weekends)
UCB	30	30	15
EXBLU	60	60	60
EXGRN	60	60	60

== Fixed-Route Bus Fleet ==
Vehicle(s)	Year	Manufacturer	Model	Notes
Active Fleet
8531-8534	2025	New Flyer	Xcelsior (XE60)	
8511-8522	2025	New Flyer	Xcelsior (XE40)	
8501-8502	2025	New Flyer	Xcelsior (XE35)	
7223 – 7224	2022	New Flyer	Xcelsior (XE60)	
7211 – 7213	2022	New Flyer	Xcelsior (XE40)	Unit 7212 is wrapped in a full body Virginia Tech Well-Being promotional livery.
7021 – 7022	2020	New Flyer	Xcelsior (XE60)	Unit 7022 is wrapped in a full body “Charged Up” electric bus promotional livery.
7005 – 7007	2020	New Flyer	Xcelsior (XE35)	Unit 7007 is wrapped in a full body “Charged Up” electric bus promotional livery.
6931 – 6932	2019	New Flyer	Xcelsior (XD60)	First buses to be painted in the maroon and gray Blacksburg Transit livery.
6726 – 6729	2018	New Flyer	Xcelsior (XD60)	
6425	2014	New Flyer	Xcelsior (XD60)	
6411 – 6414	2014	New Flyer	Xcelsior (XD40)	Unit 6413 is wrapped in a full body Virginia Tech “Ring Bus” livery. Unit 6414 is wrapped in a full body CMG Leasing advertisement.
6401 – 6404	2014	New Flyer	Xcelsior (XD35)	
6323 – 6324	2013	New Flyer	Xcelsior (XD60)	
6305 – 6308	2013	New Flyer	Xcelsior (XD35)	Unit 6305 is wrapped in a full body Blacksburg “Love Where You Live” wrap. Unit 6306 is wrapped in a full body New River Community College advertisement.
Retired Fleet
6201 – 6204	2012		Xcelsior (XD35)	All units are still active in the contingency fleet; Unit 6201 is wrapped in a full body “No Hokie Left Behind” promotional livery.
6021 – 6022	2010		Low Floor (DE60LFR)	Unit 6021 is still active in the contingency fleet; Unit 6022 was retired in 2023
6011 – 6017	2010		Low Floor (DE40LFR)	Units 6011, 6012, 6014, 6015 and 6017 are still active in the contingency fleet; Unit 6017 is wrapped in a Hybrid Electric Bus promotional livery and is affectionately known as the “Hippie Bus.”
1911–1924	2009		Low Floor (D40LFR)	Retired in 2025
2711, 2712	2007	New Flyer	Low Floor (D40LF)	
2701	2007	New Flyer	Low Floor (D35LF)	
2015, 2025	2002	New Flyer	Low Floor (D60LF)	EX-Rutgers University (DOTS) 2015 & 2025
5211 – 5218	2002	New Flyer	Low Floor (D40LF)	5217 remained in extended service
5201 – 5202	2002	New Flyer	Low Floor (D35LF)	5201 & 5202 sold to Radford Transit
4201, 4202	2002	New Flyer	Low Floor (D30LF)	4201 & 4202 sold to Radford Transit
3101 – 3106	2001	New Flyer	Low Floor (D35LF)	
1811–1816	1998	New Flyer	Low Floor (D40LF)	
1801–1809	1998	New Flyer	Low Floor (D35LF)	
3612, 3621, 3637, 3639	1976	New Flyer	New Look	EX-PENTRAN 612, 621, 637, 639; 3612 & 3621 donated to Commonwealth Coach and Trolley Museum
2614 – 2616	1987	Flxible	Metro (40102-6N)	2616 donated to Commonwealth Coach and Trolley Museum
2604 – 2606	1987	Flxible	Metro (35102-6N)	
2611 – 2613	1986	Flxible	Metro (40102-6N)	
2601 – 2603	1986	Flxible	Metro (35102-6N)	
1911–1912	1989	TMC	RTS	Sold to WATA as JC250901 – JC250904; JC250902(1902) donated to Commonwealth Coach and Trolley Museum
1901–1902	1989	TMC	RTS (T802)	Sold to WATA as JC250901 – JC250904; JC250902(1902) donated to Commonwealth Coach and Trolley Museum
1701–1703	1977	Flxible	New Look	EX-Gateway Regional Transit Authority (Bluefield, VA) 7701 – 7703
1611, 1613, 1616, 1618	1966	GMC	New Look	EX-GRTC 411, 413, 416, 418
1603–1606	1966	GMC	New Look	EX-Winston-Salem Transit Authority (WSTA) 1603–1606
1508–1510	1965	GMC	New Look	EX-GRTC 401, 409, 410
1501, 1502	1965	GMC	New Look	EX-Winston-Salem Transit Authority (WSTA) 1601, 1602
1309	1984	Blue Bird	City Bird	
1302–1308	1983	Blue Bird	City Bird	

== See also ==
- Transportation in Virginia
