= Stroubles Creek =

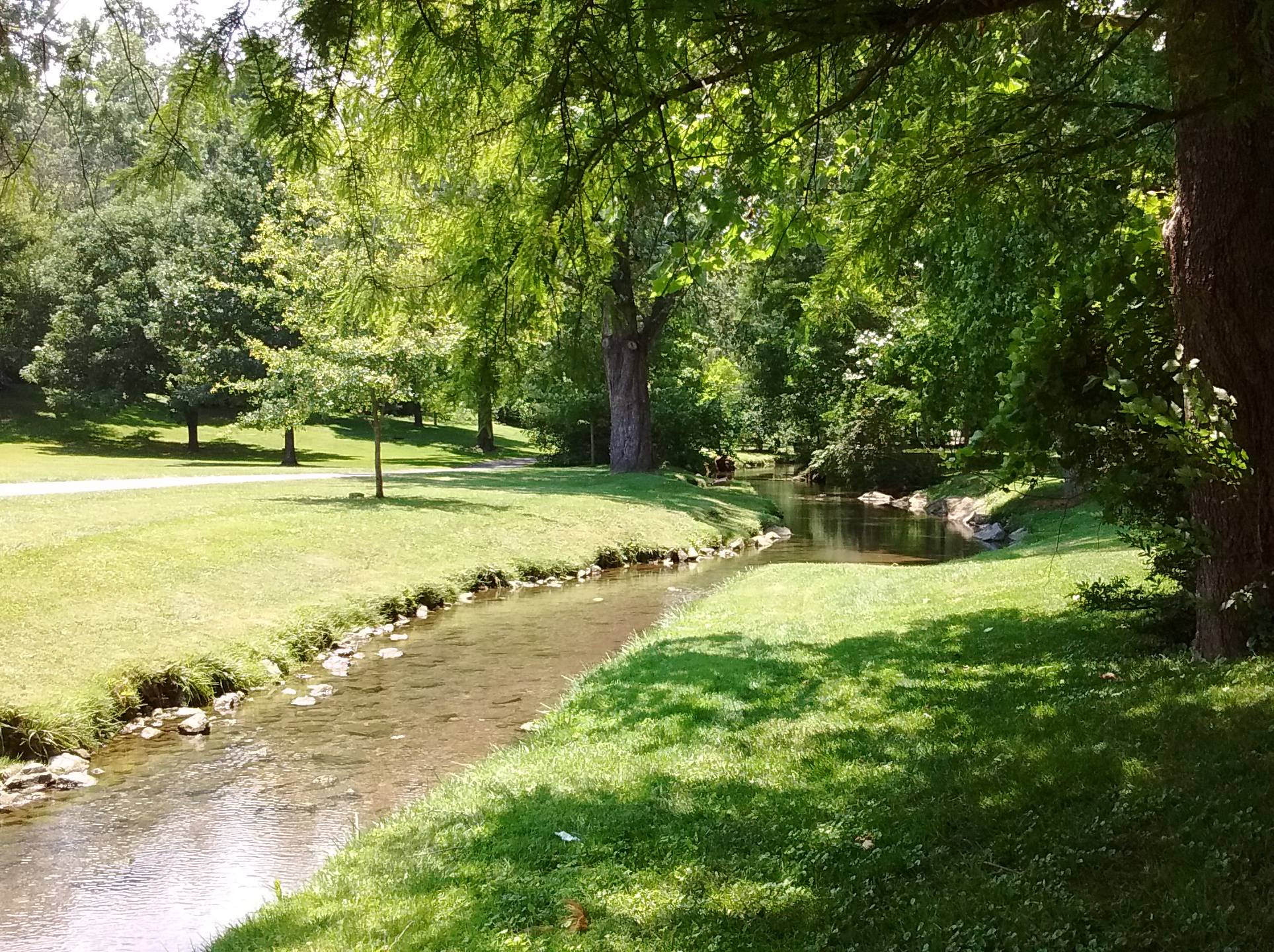
- Stroubles Creek just upstream of the Virginia Tech Duck Pond

Location
- Country: United States
- City: Blacksburg, Virginia

Physical characteristics
- Mouth
  - location: New River
  - coordinates: 37.1903°N 80.5275°W
  - elevation: 1,700 feet (520 m)
- Length: 12 mi (19 km)
- Basin size: 22.4 mi^{2} (58 km^{2})

Basin features
- Landmarks: Virginia Tech
- Tributaries
  - left: Slate Branch
  - right: Walls Branch
- Waterbodies: Virginia Tech Duck Pond

Stroubles Creek is an approximately 12-mile-long (19 km) stream that runs through the town of Blacksburg, the Virginia Tech campus, and Montgomery County, Virginia until it empties into the New River. Most of the sections of Stroubles Creek that flow through Blacksburg and the Virginia Tech campus are piped underground, while the portion that flows through Montgomery County is above-ground. Stroubles Creek has been designated an impaired waterway since 2002.

== Physical characteristics ==
=== Stream ===
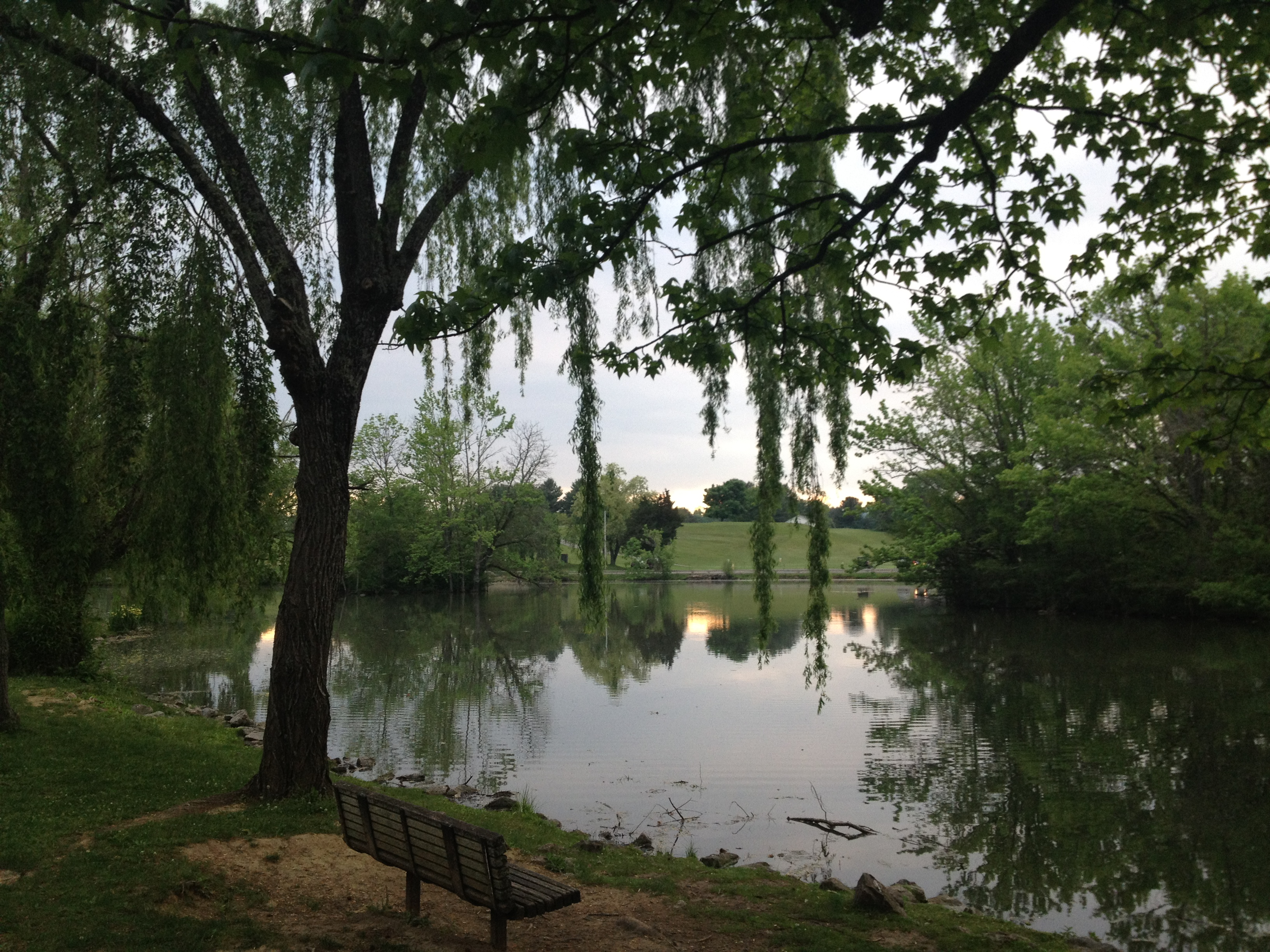
The Virginia Tech Duck Pond is formed by a dammed section of Stroubles Creek.

Stroubles Creek flows into the New River, which then flows into the Kanawha River, the Ohio River, the Mississippi River, and finally the Gulf of Mexico. There are two branches that merge at the Virginia Tech Duck Pond: the Main Branch and the Webb Branch. Downstream of the Duck Pond, many tributary streams flow into Stroubles Creek, including Slate Branch and Walls Branch.

=== Watershed ===
The Stroubles Creek watershed, a subwatershed of the New River watershed, is 22.4 square miles (58 km^{2}). The Stroubles Creek watershed is further divided into an upper and a lower watershed, with the Virginia Tech Duck Pond acting as a divider between the two. The Upper Stroubles Creek watershed is approximately 3 square miles (7.8 km^{2}), and it is heavily impacted by urbanization in Blacksburg and on the Virginia Tech campus. The Lower Stroubles Creek watershed includes some urbanized areas on the western side of the Virginia Tech campus, but then it flows mostly through rural lands until it reaches the New River. The watershed is located in karst terrain, with limestone formations, sinkholes, and natural springs. The stream bed is made up of cobbles and pebbles with alluvia-floodplain deposits (stratified unconsolidated silt, clay, and sand with lenses).

== History ==
European settlers first moved into the Stroubles Creek area in the 1740s. It acted as a water source for the settlers, although today the New River is used as the water source for the area. In 1798, the town of Blacksburg was founded in the upper Stroubles Creek watershed. In 1851, the Preston and Olin Institute was opened, which would later become Virginia Tech. In 1937, Virginia Tech's Drillfield was constructed, which resulted in the main branch of Stroubles Creek being culverted underground. The Virginia Tech Duck Pond was also created at this time when a dam was constructed where the two branches merged.

=== Pollution incidents ===
The Stroubles Creek watershed has experienced pollution going back to the 1800s. From the 19th century to the 1930s, coal mining wastewater contaminated the watershed. From 1970 to 1978, chemical waste from the Virginia Tech chemistry labs was discharged directly into the Duck Pond. In 1985, kerosene was spilled into the Duck Pond. And in 2006, 50 to 80 US gallons (190 to 300 L) of fuel oil were spilled into the stream from a local hardware store's 275-US-gallon (1,040 L) above-ground storage tank.

In the 1970s, the Clean Water Act prompted the Virginia Department of Environmental Quality (DEQ) to monitor the lower portion of the stream downstream of the Duck Pond. The DEQ classified lower Stroubles Creek as benthically impaired in 1996 and 1998. In 2002, Stroubles Creek was included as an impaired waterway in the Virginia total maximum daily load (TMDL) list of impaired waterways. The Virginia Tech Department of Biological Systems Engineering (BSE) conducted a study on the stream in 2003, and a TMDL implementation plan was completed in 2006 by the Center for TMDL and Watershed Studies through the BSE department.

== See also ==
- List of rivers of Virginia
