= Luna Innovations =

American technology product developer

Luna Innovations Incorporated
- Company type: Public
- Traded as: Nasdaq: LUNA; Russell Microcap Index component
- Industry: Aerospace, Automotive, Communications, Defense, Energy, Infrastructure, Security, and Silicon Photonics
- Founded: 1991; 35 years ago, in Blacksburg, Virginia
- Headquarters: Roanoke, Virginia, U.S.
- Key people: Scott A. Graeff (president & CEO)
- Products: Fiber Optic Sensing (ODiSI), Fiber Optic Test & Measurement Products (OVA, OBR, Tunable Lasers) and Terahertz Test & Measurement (T-Ray, T-Gauge)
- Website: http://www.lunainc.com

Luna Innovations Incorporated is an American developer and manufacturer of fiber-optics- and terahertz-based technology products for the aerospace, automotive, communications, defense, energy, infrastructure, security, and silicon photonics industries. It is headquartered in Roanoke, Virginia. Luna's products are used to test, measure, analyze, monitor, protect and improve products and processes to enhance the safety, security, and connectivity of people.

Luna Innovations holds more than 450 U.S. and international patents in fiber optics and specializes in products for fiber-optic testing of components, modules and networks, as well as integrated optics and distributed fiber-optic sensor solutions. Their fiber-optic test and measurement devices include optical analyzers, reflectometers, tunable lasers, optical switches and customized systems for strain, temperature, shape and position sensing.

Luna Labs works with government agencies on technology development in these four core areas: sensors and systems (fiber optics and ultrasonics); health sciences; and advanced materials including corrosion inhibitors, self-cleaning and self-healing coatings, impact indicators, flame retardant additives and nanomaterials; and secure computing using hardware-based anti-tamper technologies.

Luna Innovations was founded by Kent Murphy, an electrical engineering professor at Virginia Tech and was originally headquartered in Blacksburg, Virginia, and still has a manufacturing facility there. It moved its headquarters to Roanoke in September 2006. It has locations across Virginia: Blacksburg, Roanoke, and Charlottesville, as well as locations in Ann Arbor, Michigan; Atlanta, Georgia; and Santa Clara and Chino, California. In December 2020, Luna Innovations also acquired OptaSense, which had 8 locations across Europe, North America and the Middle East.

Luna Innovations had an initial public offering in June 2006 with the NASDAQ trading symbol LUNA.

== Acquisitions ==
Two companies developed from Luna Innovations have been sold to other companies. Luna Energy, which developed pipeline monitoring sensors for the oil and gas industry, was acquired by oilfield services firm Baker Hughes. Baker Hughes helped build Luna Energy in 2002 with a 40% stake in the organization. In December of 2004, Baker Hughes purchased the remaining 60%. Luna i-Monitoring, which developed a suite of integrated wireless sensors for remote monitoring for the oil and gas industry, was acquired by IHS Energy.

Luna has acquired companies with adjacent and complementary technologies, including Micron Optics, General Photonics, OptaSense, and LIOS.
