= Blacksburg Volunteer Rescue Squad =

Volunteer rescue agency

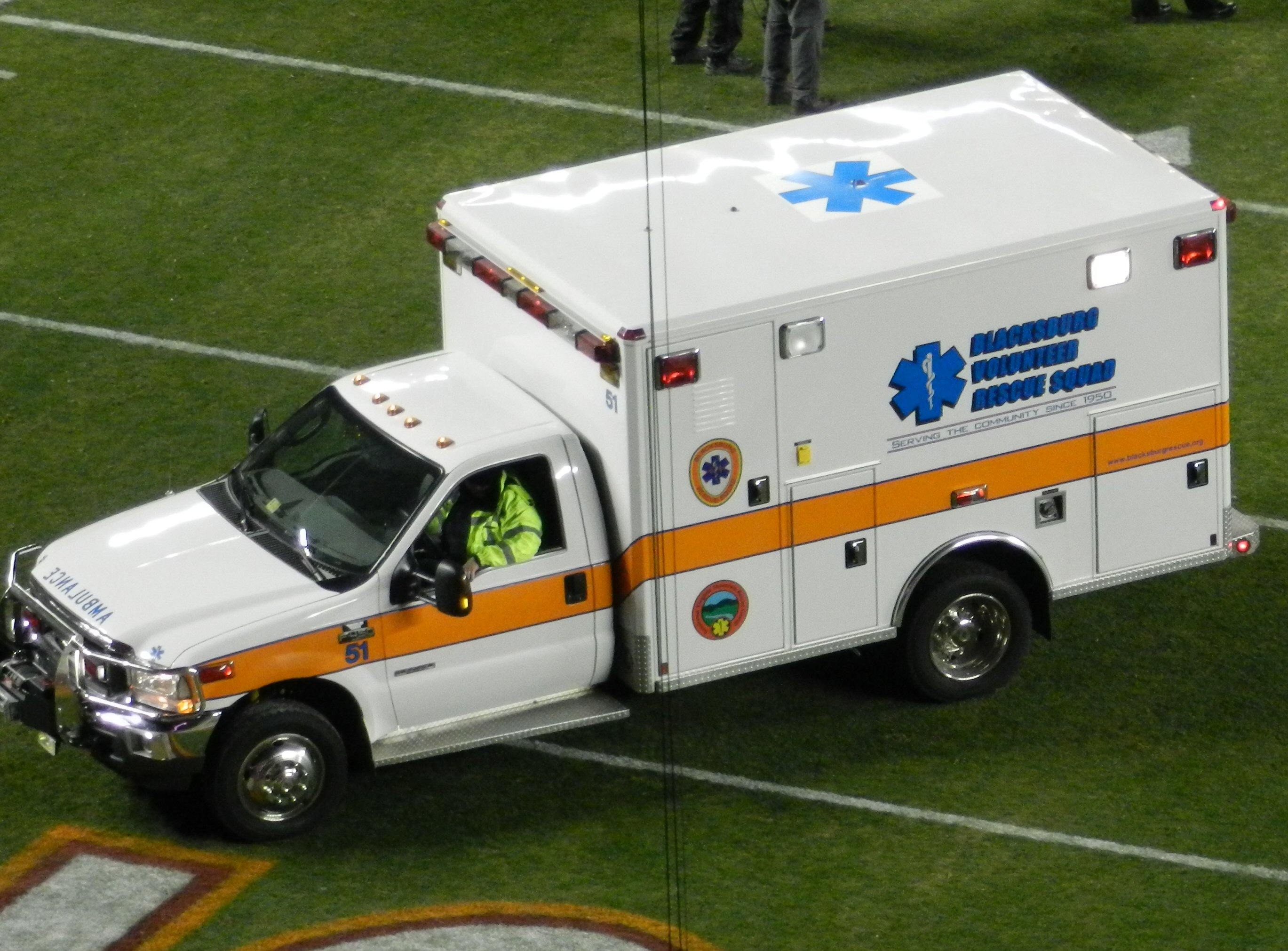
An ambulance from the Blacksburg Volunteer Rescue Squad drives onto Worsham Field at Lane Stadium for an injured player during Virginia Tech's 2012 game against Florida State.

The Blacksburg Volunteer Rescue Squad was established in 1950 as an all-volunteer EMS agency providing free service to a community of approximately 55,000 residents, including half of Montgomery County, Virginia, and the Town of Blacksburg. The squad has about 120 members, including community members with full-time jobs, as well as high school and college students.

== History ==
Blacksburg Volunteer Life Saving and First Aid Crew, Inc. was organized in the spring of 1950, with 25 active members. The first vehicle was a Chevrolet panel truck purchased from Blacksburg Motor Company. The vehicle was housed at the Blacksburg Esso gas station until a shed could be built near the old two-bay fire station behind the old Town Hall. The first activity report submitted to the Virginia Association of Volunteer Rescue Squads dated September 1, 1951, to September 1, 1952, listed 96 calls for that year. In 1953, due to most members also serving on the Blacksburg Volunteer Fire Department, the two groups merged becoming the Blacksburg Volunteer Fire Department and First Aid Crew. The group stayed together until January 1, 1986. At that time, due to the growth of the area and the time and training required, they split into two separate organizations.

In 1957, Blacksburg Town Council provided funds for the construction of a building to house the equipment of the Blacksburg Volunteer Fire and First Aid Crew. The building on Progress Street was designed to provide space for four vehicles, a meeting hall and a storage room. In 1958, the town annexed a portion of the county, thus doubling the population and adding a considerable number of residences and business establishments. All this new territory became the responsibility of the crew. In 1969 due to state regulations, most of the area funeral homes discontinued ambulance service, placing an extra burden on the rescue crew. In 1971, the crew bought its first custom-built ambulance. The crew completed its first Emergency Medical Technician's course in 1972. This growth required some expansion of the crew and of the crew hall. In 1981 the Progress Street station was expanded, and the crew purchased its first Advanced Life Support ambulance.

In 1986, the BVRS became an independent organization. In 1989, for the first time in its 39-year history, the squad brought home its first two trophies from the Virginia Association of Volunteer Rescue Squad's annual convention held at Virginia Beach. The squad continues to grow to keep up with the growth of Blacksburg. With no end in sight for the town's growth, the squad hopes to continue to adapt and implement the latest in life saving techniques and equipment.

Summer of 2016 saw BVRS move into a new purpose-built station, Station 5, on the corner of Progress and Patrick Henry.

In 2017, BVRS received the Virginia Governor's EMS Award for Outstanding EMS Agency.

=== Major Incident ===
==== Solar House ====
Sept. 30, 2003 - An accident at an apartment building known as the “Solar House” resulted in a fatality and multiple injuries. A punk rock concert at a Blacksburg rental house where man died and others were injured after falling from a third-story window. BVRS responded and transported many patients.

==== Virginia Tech Shooting ====
The April 16, 2007 Virginia Tech shooting, was at the time the worst mass shooting in U.S. history by one gunman where 32 students and faculty were shot and killed. BVRS responded with six ambulances and 42 BVRS members.

- West Ambler Johnston - Three BVRS Advanced Life Support (ALS) members responded to a mutual aid request to West Ambler Johnston Residence Hall for two gunshot victims. One patient was transported to Roanoke Memorial Hospital's Trauma 1 Center by BVRS.
- Norris Hall - A BVRS medic was on the Blacksburg Police Emergency Response Team (ERT) team that went into Norris Hall, and he and a Virginia Tech Rescue Squad Medic initiated triage and of the victims.
- ICS and Unified Command established.
- After Norris Hall was cleared and secured, three BVRS members went in assess casualties and confirm status of deceased victims.
- At least 17 students and faculty were transported to regional hospitals or treated on scene by the various EMS agencies that were on scene. Besides BVRS ambulances, there were ambulances from Christiansburg Rescue, Carilion Transport Services, Salem Rescue, Newport Rescue and other agencies responded with ambulances not knowing how many patients might need to be transported.

After the Virginia State Police forensic examiners completed scene examination and documentation, BVRS transported or coordinated the transport of 32 victims to the Medical Examiner's Officer in Roanoke.

==== Carbon Monoxide Poisoning ====
On Sunday, August 19, 2007, a total of 23 students were overcome by carbon monoxide in a Blacksburg apartment complex and were taken the hospital. Five of these patients were airlifted to UVA Medical Center or Duke University Medical Center for serious complications from the carbon monoxide poisoning.

==== Federal Mogul Explosion ====
December 31, 2010, three people were injured when an explosion tore open a section of the Federal-Mogul building in Blacksburg. The explosion occurred around 9:30 a.m. The first emergency responders on the scene reported at least two people with serious burns who were airlifted to Baptist Hospital at Wake Forest University in North Carolina

==== Cave Rescue ====
On a late winter afternoon in 2011, multiple fire, rescue and EMS units were dispatched to the edge of a rural farm for a patient trapped in the entrance of a cave. Before the 12-hour rescue was successfully completed at 3:00 A.M., over 50 first responders and a medical evacuation helicopter team were involved in the slow procedure of freeing the patient in 14-degree temperature.

== Organization ==
=== EMS Division ===
The core function of BVRS. Care is provided by approximately 120 volunteer EMTs, AEMTs, and Paramedics.

=== Special Operations Division ===
Cave Rescue - Blacksburg Cave Rescue Group (BCRG) - "is a group of volunteers with specialized cave rescue training based out of the Blacksburg Volunteer Rescue Squad (BVRS). Our group responds to cave rescues that are typically extended operations that require an organized command structure, physical ability, specialized training, and equipment outside the scope of Emergency Medical Services (EMS) calls. We are deployed locally as well as regionally."

Water Rescue - Responds to water related emergencies in conjunction with New River Valley Water Rescue and Recovery Association

Trench Rescue - Responds to trench collapses to provide rescue/recovery

Vertical Rescue - Provides technical and semi-technical high and low angle rope rescue

Search and Rescue - Southwest Virginia Mountain Rescue Group (SWVaMRG) - "We encounter a variety of tasks while on mission that can include: searching for missing persons, searching for downed aircraft, performing semi-technical and technical evacuations, search management, and assisting in disaster recovery. The conglomeration of our training includes, but is not limited to: wilderness medicine, survival skills, land navigation, search tactics, search theory, clue awareness, sign cutting, tracking, remote rescue operations, disaster response, and search management."

Rescue Task Force (RTF) - Additionally trained EMTs wearing body armor that make entry into the "Warm Zone" of an Active Shooter event to imitate triage and treatment.
