= Blacksburg, Virginia =

Town in Virginia, United States

- Town
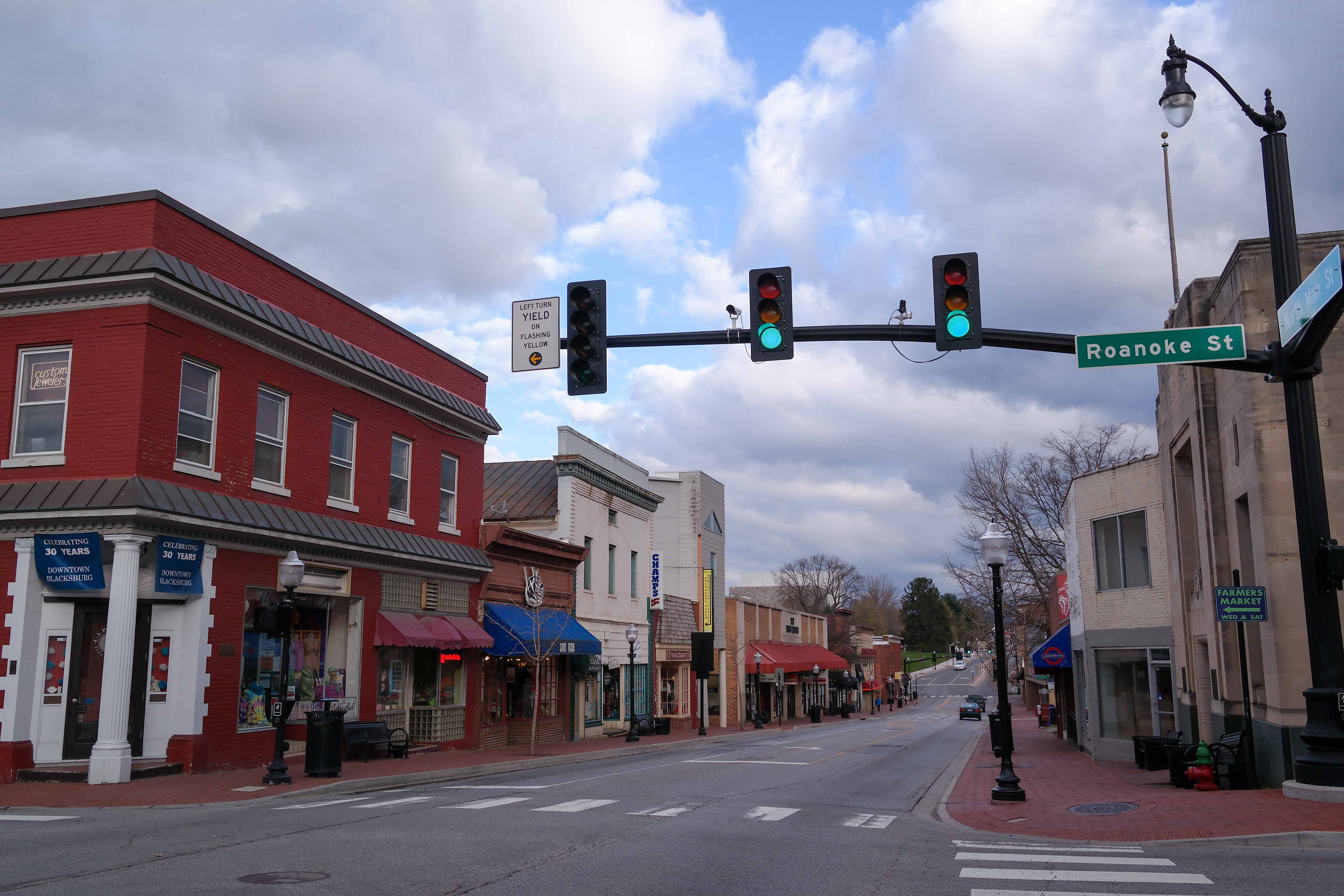
- Downtown Blacksburg

- Location within Virginia Location within the United States
- Coordinates: 37°13′48″N 80°25′4″W
- Country: United States
- State: Virginia
- County: Montgomery
- Founded: 1798
- Named for: Samuel Black

Government
  - Mayor: Michael Sutphin

Area
  - Town: 19.77 sq mi (51.20 km^{2})
  - Land: 19.74 sq mi (51.12 km^{2})
  - Water: 0.031 sq mi (0.08 km^{2}) 0.10%
- Elevation: 2,080 ft (630 m)

Population (2020)
  - Town: 44,826
  - Density: 2,271/sq mi (876.9/km^{2})
  - Metro: 181,863
- Demonym: Blacksburger
- Time zone: UTC−5 (EST)
  - Summer (DST): UTC−4 (EDT)
- ZIP Codes: 24060–24063
- Area code: 540
- FIPS code: 51-07784
- GNIS feature ID: 1498405
- Website: www.blacksburg.gov

Blacksburg is an incorporated town in Montgomery County, Virginia, United States, with a population of 44,826 at the 2020 census. Blacksburg and the surrounding county is dominated economically and demographically by the presence of Virginia Tech.

Blacksburg, Christiansburg, and the city of Radford are the three principal jurisdictions of the Blacksburg-Christiansburg metropolitan area, which encompasses those jurisdictions and all of Montgomery, Pulaski, and Giles counties for statistical purposes. The MSA has an estimated population of 181,863 and is currently one of the faster-growing MSAs in Virginia.

== History ==
=== European colonization, founding (1671–1771) ===
In the mid-1600s, English colonists were still uncertain of what lay beyond the Allegheny Mountains, whose topography and possession by native inhabitants, Tutelo-speaking tribes, were a barrier to expanded settlement by the Colony of Virginia. Abraham Wood, who commanded Fort Henry on the frontier (now the site of Petersburg, Virginia), and operated an Indian trading post nearby, organized several expeditions to explore farther west. A passage over the ridge was finally found in 1671 when explorers Batts and Fallam, sent by Wood, reached the present-day location of Blacksburg, Virginia. Their expedition followed Stroubles Creek, through the current locations of the town and campus of Virginia Tech, to what they named Wood's River.

They reported the area as inhabited by the Monacan and Moneton, Siouan-speaking groups, but the Virginian colonial legislature had authorized Wood to claim it. Accordingly, on September 17, 1671, the Batts and Fallam party claimed all of the lands comprising the river's drainage basin for King Charles II. However, the region was not yet open to English patent. In 1700, Seneca warriors of the Iroquois Confederacy based in New York and Pennsylvania, overran the entire area, driving out the other bands. As early as 1718, the Seneca had agreed to sell the parts they had conquered east of the Blue Ridge to the Colony of Virginia. Following another cession at the 1744 Treaty of Lancaster, however, there was a dispute between the tribe and colonists over whether the new boundary was the Alleghenies or the Ohio River. The site of Blacksburg lay just within this disputed zone.

By the 1740s, the Wood's River Land Company, represented by Colonel James Patton, gained a large tract of land within present-day southwest Virginia. Part of the tract became Montgomery County and Pulaski County and was sold to Virginian, Irish, Scots-Irish, and English settlers as a reward for their services during the American Indian Wars and other wars. The Draper and Ingles families were among those who built their homes at Draper's Meadow by 1748; this area was between the present location of the campus and the subdivision of Hethwood.

Because of its strategic location between powerful Indian nations, who alternately allied with the French or British as it suited them, plus its location through gaps into the Alleghenies further west, the area's development was viewed with increasing apprehension by the French and their Indian allies. In July 1755, during the French and Indian War, hostile Shawnee Indians equipped and armed by France attacked the frontier outpost at Draper's Meadow, which then had around twenty pioneer settlers. About four settlers were killed in the attacks, and five were taken captive to Kentucky by the Shawnee, among them Mary Draper Ingles, who later escaped. The memorial to Draper's Meadow massacre was dedicated on a bridge located near Duck Pond. By the end of the war, Draper's Meadow was deserted.

By the Treaty of Easton (1758), and again by the Royal Proclamation of 1763, the British Crown made the Allegheny ridge separating the Mississippi and Chesapeake watersheds the official boundary between their Virginia colony and native peoples. It remained so until 1768, when native claims to the land including Blacksburg were cleared by the Treaty of Hard Labour with the Cherokee, and the Treaty of Fort Stanwix with the Six Nations (Iroquois Confederacy). The Shawnee finally abandoned their claim to this territory in 1774 following Dunmore's War.

=== The Black family (1772–1797) ===
Samuel Black, whose family settled in Staunton, Virginia, bought 600 acres (2.4 km^{2}) of land in the Draper's Meadow area for his sons John and William in 1772. Smithfield Plantation, built in approximately 1774 by Colonel William Preston, was developed on the original Draper's Meadow site, near the current location of the Duck Pond on the Virginia Tech campus.

When Samuel Black died in 1792, the land was evenly divided into two sections by his sons. The road now known as Draper Road is the dividing line between the sections. John Black's property was later developed as the majority of the central campus of Virginia Tech.

In 1797, William Black laid out a small grid of streets and lots comprising 16 blocks on a portion of his land. The original town was limited to the area bounded by present-day Draper Road, Jackson Street, Wharton Street, and Clay Street. The town logo contains 16 small squares that create a larger square, representing the original 16 square blocks that were a part of Black's design.

=== Blacksburg's establishment (1798–1870) ===
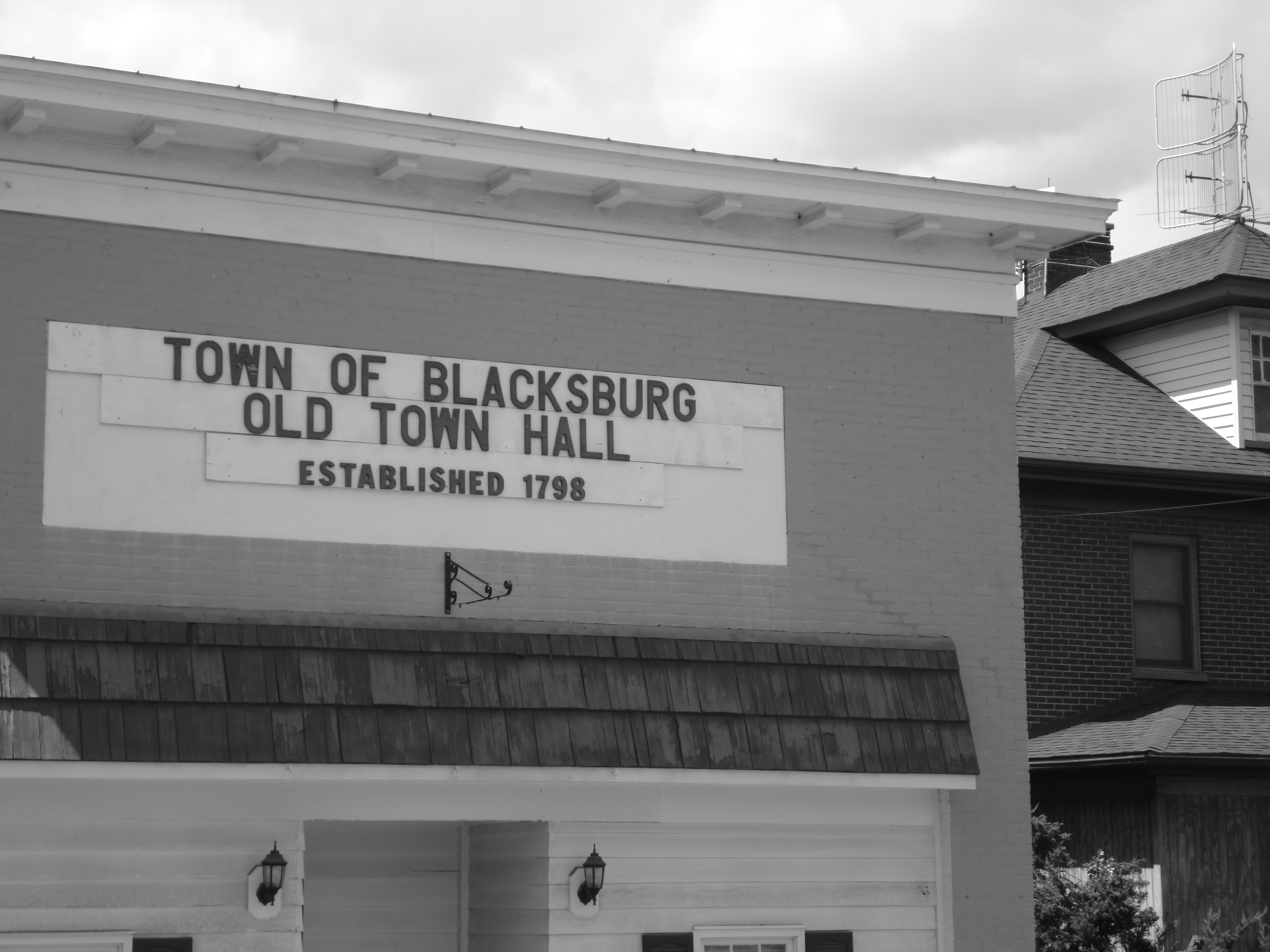
Blacksburg's old town hall

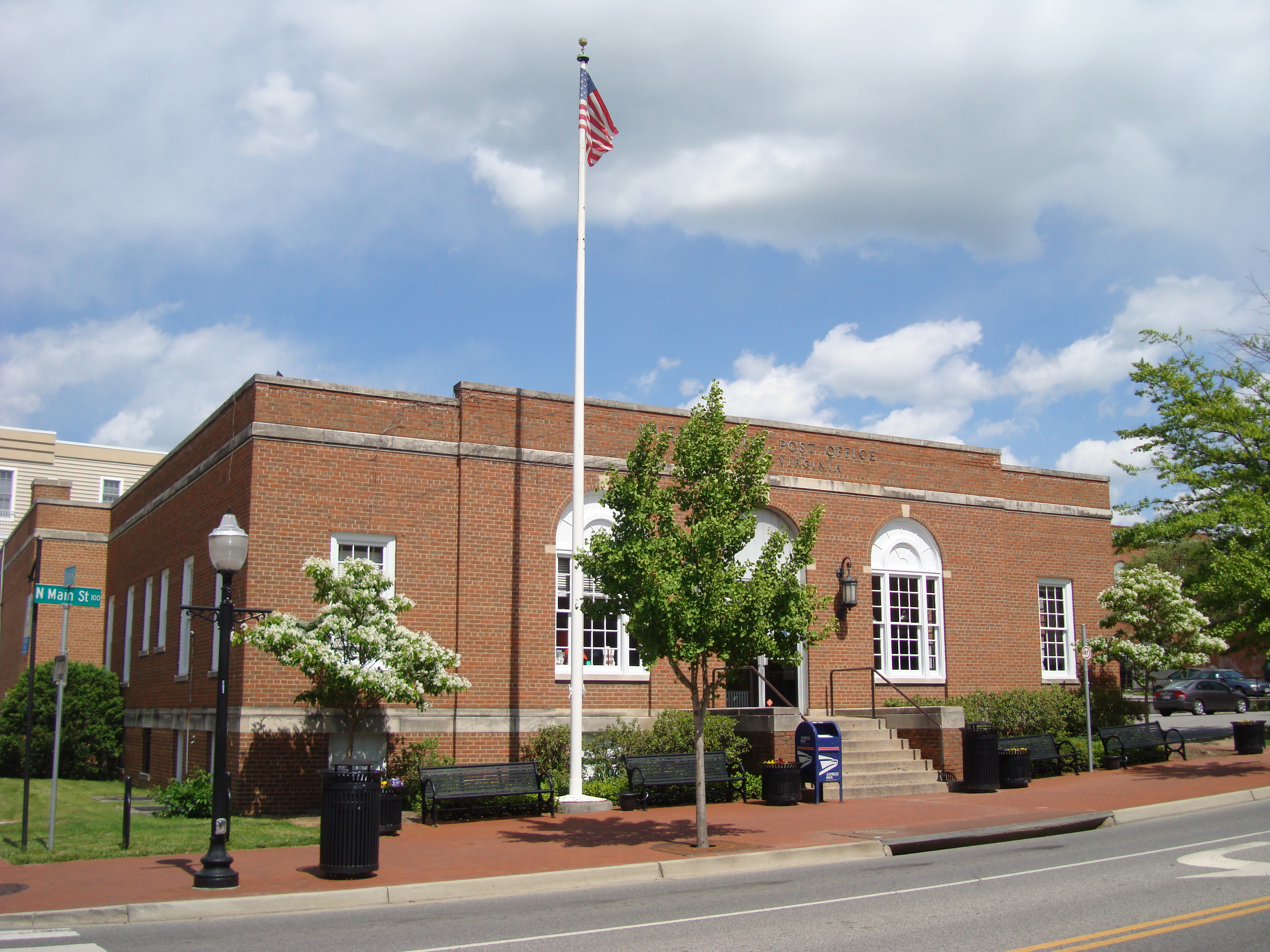
The downtown Post Office in Blacksburg

After Black petitioned the state legislature to establish a town at the site, the official establishment and founding of Blacksburg was January 13, 1798, on the 38.75-acre (15.68 ha) tract that he laid out. The following August 4, he signed over the deed to the town trustees. The town was named after him in his honor.

In 1808, a log cabin was built just east of Smithfield Plantation. Robert Preston, a future colonel of the 28th Virginia Infantry, lived here, as did two Virginia governors. The cabin was later added to in the mid 19th century to create a Greek Revival farmhouse now known as Solitude, which is the oldest building on the Virginia Tech campus. In 1872, the 250 acre Solitude farm became the central campus of Virginia Agricultural and Mechanical College, and the house, after the death of its owner in the following decade, served as a college infirmary from 1882 to 1886. It was later used for faculty housing.

According to records of the Post Office Department of the National Archives and Records Administration, the post office was established as "BLACKSBURGH" on April 8, 1827. The name was changed to the current spelling (without the "h") in 1893.

The Methodists had built two cabins to worship in since the town's founding, but they did not build a more permanent structure until 1830, when they constructed a brick church. The Presbyterians were the next Christian denomination to build a church within Blacksburg's limits. In 1848 they built their first brick building at 117 South Main Street. Though still standing, this building has not been used as a church for many years. It was once South Main Café, but is currently used as a restaurant called Cabo Fish Taco. It is also the oldest building on Main Street. The Baptists founded the third oldest church in the town in 1852.

In 1832, Westview Cemetery was established from a few acres of land that were deeded to trustees.

One of the first educational establishments started here was the Blacksburg Female Academy in 1840. The Olin and Preston Institute (re-charted as Preston and Olin Institute in 1869) was a Methodist-sponsored academy established in 1851.

The first bank in Montgomery County, Blacksburg Savings Institution, was established in 1849. The first newspaper published in Blacksburg was the Montgomery Messenger. Its first issue was printed in 1869.

=== Incorporation, modernization (1871–1951) ===
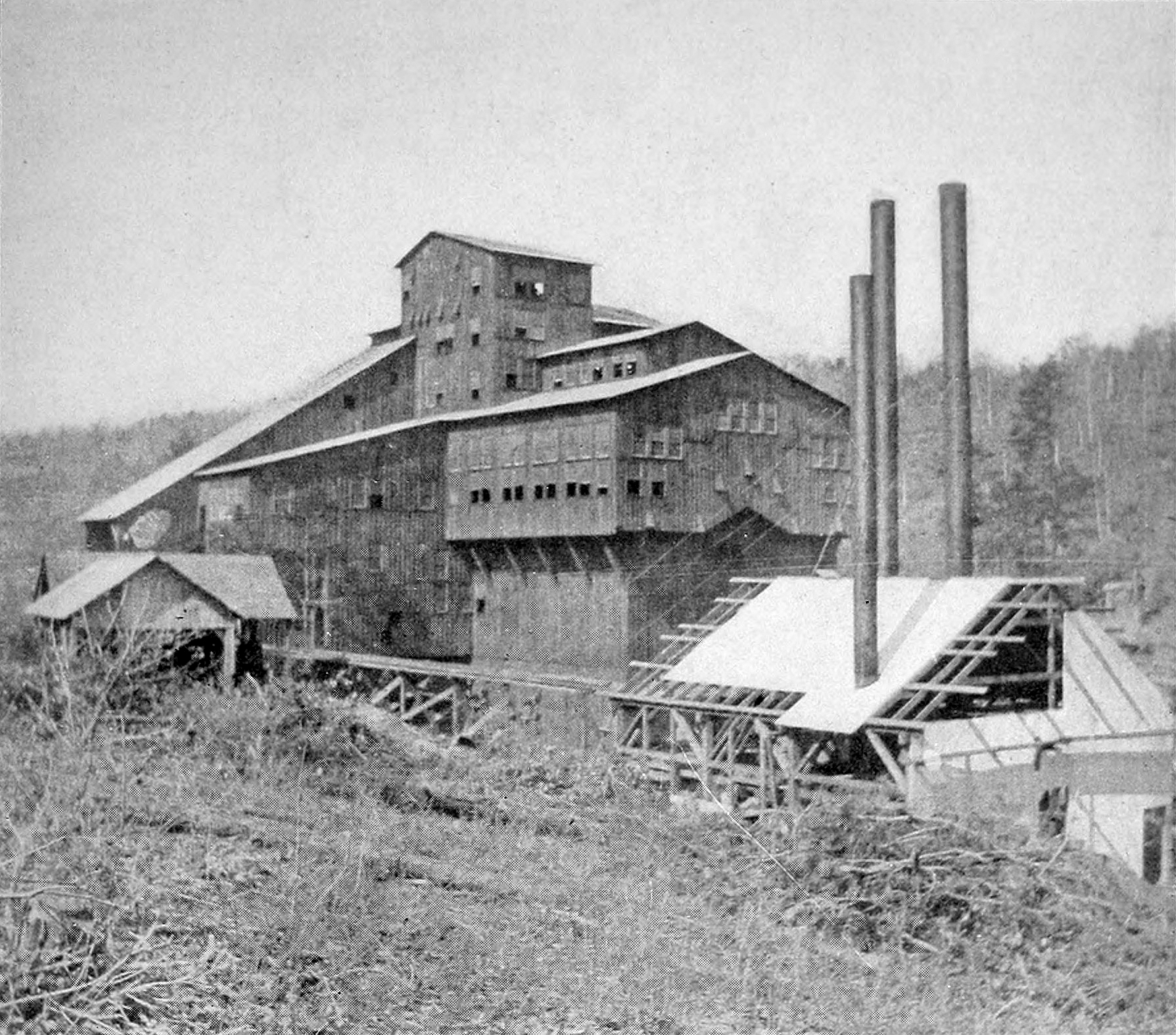
A coal breaker at the Virginia Anthracite Coal Company at Merrimac Mines near Blacksburg in 1904

In 1871, the village that became known as Blacksburg was incorporated and Thomas W. Jones became the first mayor.

One year later, the Virginia Agricultural and Mechanical College opened on October 2, 1872, with a faculty of three members. The college grew and became known as Virginia Polytechnic Institute (VPI), later, "and State University" was added to the name, which shortly afterward became informally referred to as Virginia Tech. It is now officially called Virginia Tech. It is Virginia's land-grant university.

A fire-fighting unit was organized within the university in 1899. The town bought its first fire truck 43 years later. The Blacksburg First Aid and Life Saving Crew was founded in 1951 and renamed Blacksburg Volunteer Rescue Squad in another addition to the growing amount of emergency services.

The first automobile came through the town in 1901. Three years later the train entered Blacksburg from Christiansburg using the Virginia Anthracite & Coal Railroad, which later became known as the "Huckleberry." Traffic in Blacksburg increased sufficiently enough that by January 1913 the town voted against allowing cows to continue to roam in town. The first filling station was opened in 1919 and at the time was the only one between Roanoke, Virginia, and Bluefield, West Virginia. The town's first landing strip was built in 1929 and was 1,800 feet (548.64 m) in length. The grass landing strip was given airport status in 1931 and later became Virginia Tech Airport. Local buses began to make their rounds for the first time in 1947.

The town's first theater was built in 1909. It was a precursor to the Lyric Theatre on College Avenue.

In the spring of 1935, Main Street was strung with ten street lights from Roanoke Street northward to the top of the hill, where it now intersects the Alumni Mall. By October the town's second stoplight was installed on Main Street at Roanoke Street and was synchronized with the original one at Main and College. The establishment of official law enforcement began in 1937 when Officer Dave "Highpockets" Sumner became the first Blacksburg police officer. The first police car was purchased nine years later.

=== Compulsory education and commercialization (1952–1992) ===
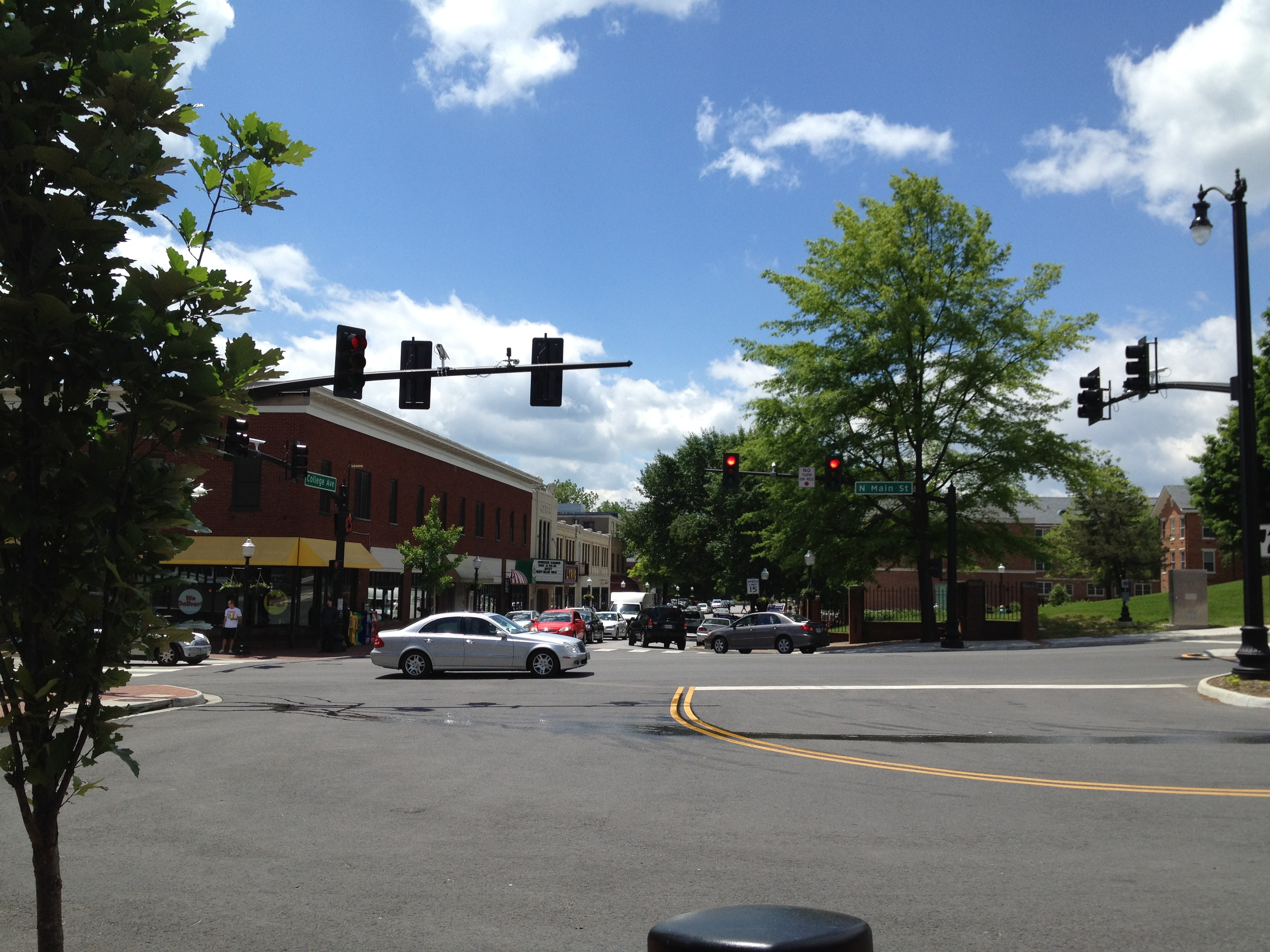
Intersection of Main Street and College Avenue

Blacksburg experienced a boost of compulsory education during the second half of the 20th century. Even though there had been a place for secondary education somewhere in town since 1906, it was not until 1952 when the first facility for Blacksburg High School was built on South Main and Eheart Streets. Later it moved to new quarters and was adapted as Blacksburg Middle School. That same year, all high schools in Montgomery County began operating on a twelve-grade basis which is still county policy to this day.

The Margaret J. Beeks Elementary School and the Gilbert F. Linkous Elementary School were both completed in 1963 and Harding Avenue Elementary School was built in 1972. Two years later, in 1974, Blacksburg High School moved its location to Patrick Henry Drive after 20 years of issues with overcrowding in its previous location.

Jack Goodwin was appointed the first chief of police by the Blacksburg Town Council in 1954. Jan Olinger was made the first female police officer in 1976.

1958 marked the beginning of the end for the railroad that came to be known as the "Huckleberry." In the 1960s, however, railroads underwent restructuring. Passenger service came to an end on July 25. On June 30, 1966, the last freight train arrived at the Blacksburg depot. Within 24 hours, the depot was closed, the empty cars were picked up, and the tracks were immediately removed. After years of effort by the citizens of the town a trail was constructed on the former railroad right-of-way and, after years of construction, funding and planning issues the Huckleberry Trail was opened to the public on December 1, 1998. 190 years after its original construction, the newly renovated Smithfield Plantation house was re-opened in 1964.

The amount of commercialization in the area began to increase in the mid-1960s. The Corning Glass Works (now called Corning Incorporated), based in upper New York State, opened a manufacturing facility in 1964 that is located south of Blacksburg. The Blacksburg Municipal Building on South Main Street was constructed in 1969. Terrace View apartments, the first large student complex, was built in 1970. The Blacksburg Branch of the Montgomery County Library was opened the same year. Ten years later, it was moved into the facility that used to house the Blacksburg Lumber Company on Draper Road. In 1971, Blacksburg ratified a new charter and LewisGale Hospital Montgomery was built. The University Mall shopping center opened that year as well. In the mid 1970s the Foxridge apartments, an even larger student apartment complex, was built as part of the Hethwood development. During 1981, the Blacksburg Community Center opened. It cost the town $1.2 million to build. By 1988, the New River Valley Mall, located in the neighboring town of Christiansburg, was opened and the Virginia Tech Corporate Research Center had its first ground-breaking ceremony.

After construction of Virginia's portion of Interstate 81 began in 1957, nine years passed before the Christiansburg-area segment was opened. About half that amount of time passed before the U.S. Route 460 bypass opened in 1969.

In the 1970s, Virginia Tech was annexed into the town and the town acquired other land. Together with the effect of the annexations, the population grew from 9,000 people to 30,000 during this decade. Replacing the old public bus system, Blacksburg Transit began running in 1983.

=== Information age (1993–present) ===
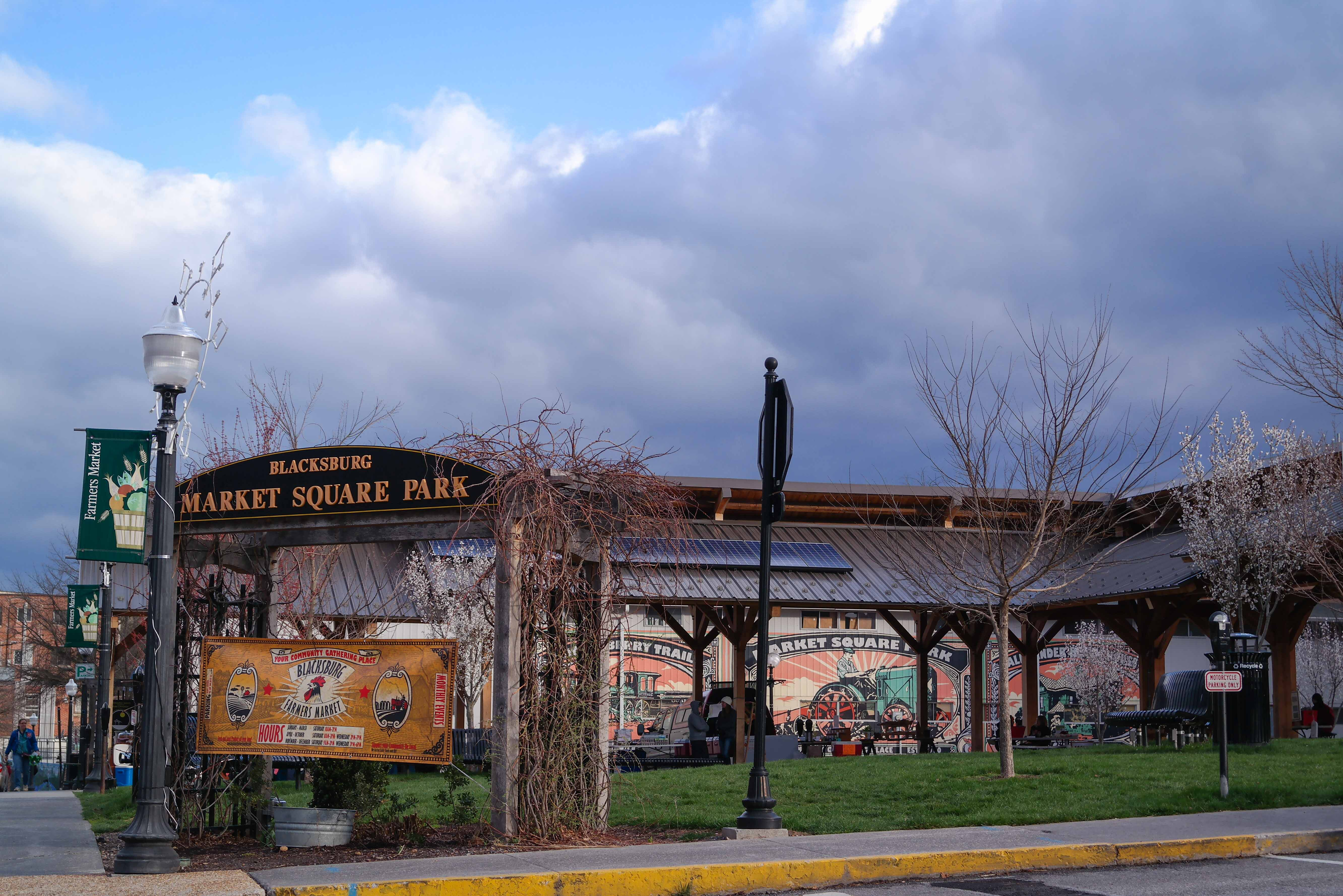
Market Square Park, home of the Blacksburg Farmers Market since 2009

Blacksburg is the site of the Blacksburg Electronic Village or BEV, conceived as a computer networking project of Virginia Tech in 1991 and officially born in 1993 as a way to link the town together using the Internet. This project quickly ushered the town into what is being called the Information Age.

In 1994, Montgomery County Public Schools completed construction of Kipps Elementary School at 2801 Prices Fork Road. By this time, Blacksburg had five elementary schools, a middle school, and a high school. A newly renovated Blacksburg branch library was opened in 1996.

In the aftermath of railroad restructuring, many rail lines were abandoned. After 24 years of abandonment and six years of planning and construction, the first phase of the Huckleberry Trail built on the old Huckleberry railbed opened in 1996. The second phase of construction was completed in 1998. In 2019, the Blacksburg Rotary Mountain Bike Skills Park opened with funding from Blacksburg Parks and Recreation and donations.

On July 8, 1997, ground was broken for the experimental "Smart Road" project. The second phase of construction was completed in 2002. The road is currently closed to the public and used as a research test bed for the Virginia Tech Transportation Institute. A National Weather Service office is located in Blacksburg and serves most of southwestern Virginia, southeast West Virginia, and northwest North Carolina.

In 2003, the new building for Blacksburg Middle School students opened on Prices Fork Road adjacent to the property housing Kipps Elementary School.

On April 16, 2007, Seung-Hui Cho shot 32 people dead and injured an additional 17 in the Virginia Tech shooting before committing suicide. The massacre is the deadliest mass shooting on a college campus since the University of Texas tower shooting in 1966.

On January 21, 2009, Zhu Haiyang decapitated Yang Xin at Virginia Tech in the first campus murder since the Virginia Tech shooting.

On February 13, 2010, following a snowstorm that dropped two feet of snow on the area, the gymnasium roof on the previously occupied Blacksburg High School suffered a catastrophic structural failure and collapsed, causing structural damage to other areas of the school. The school building was condemned and students attended night school on a split schedule with the Blacksburg Middle School students at their school for the remainder of the year. It was determined that repair costs would exceed $18 million and would not be feasible given the age of the school; it was decided not to repair the building. Before the school year of 2013-14 Blacksburg High School was operating on a normal schedule out of the Blacksburg Middle School building on 3109 Prices Fork Road, and the middle schoolers were going to school in the old Christiansburg Middle School. The original Blacksburg High School building was vacant until it was demolished in the Summer of 2011. The newly constructed school building of Blacksburg High School which opened for the 2013 fall semester is located at 3401 Bruin Lane, behind the current Blacksburg Middle School and Bill Brown Football Stadium.

== Government ==
Blacksburg is governed by a Town Council of six members and a mayor. Elections take place in November of odd-numbered years. Council members are elected for four-year terms.

The town’s mayor is an elected office.

By tradition, the town's vice-mayor is the councilperson who received the highest number of votes in the most recent election and is formally elected by council at the first meeting of the new year.

Position	Member	First elected	Term Expires
Mayor	Michael Sutphin	2011 (Mayor since 2025)	2029
Vice Mayor	Susan Anderson	2006	2029
Councilmember	Darryl Campbell	2025	2029
Councilmember	Lauren Colliver	2017	2029
Councilmember	Jerry R. Ford, Jr.	2018	2027
Councilmember	Joel Goodhart	Appointed 2025	2026
Councilmember	Andrew Kassoff	Appointed 2025	2026

== Geography ==
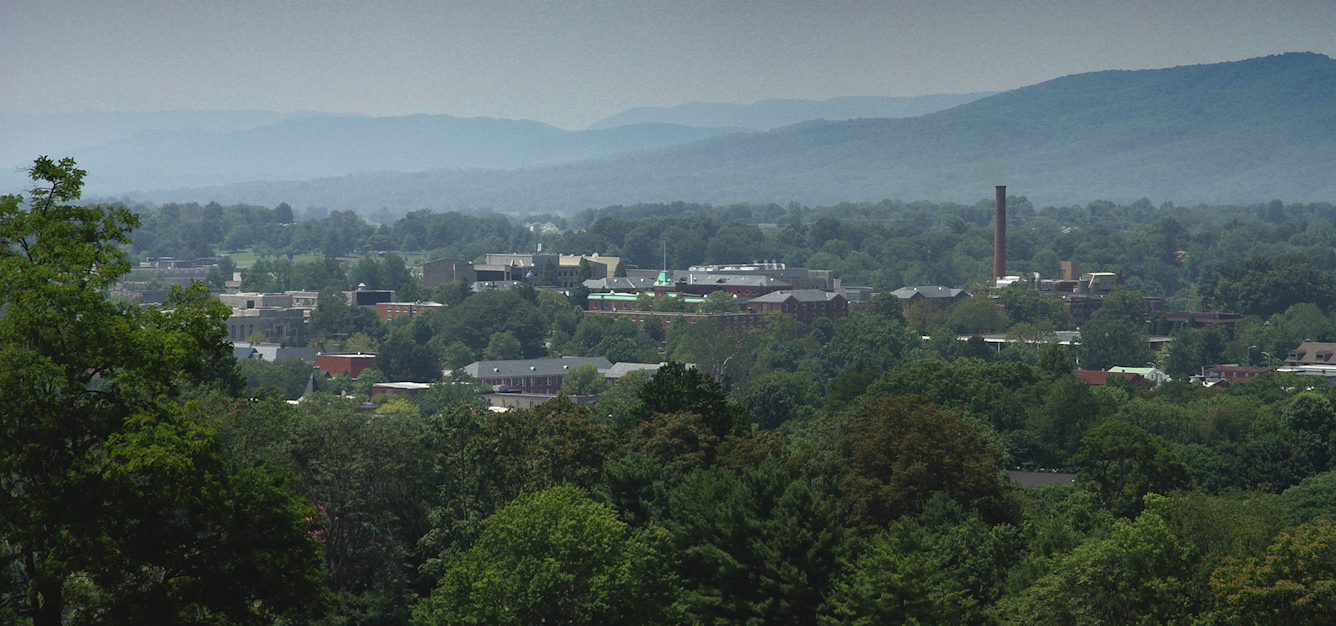
Overlooking Blacksburg

According to the United States Census Bureau, the town has a total area of 19.89 square miles (51.5 km^{2}) of which 19.89 square miles (51.5 km^{2}) is land and 0.04 square miles (0.10 km^{2}), or 0.10%, is water. At 2,080 feet (634 m) above sea level, Blacksburg is located in the New River Valley and also sits astride the Eastern Continental Divide. It is the 15th largest municipality and the largest town in the commonwealth of Virginia. The Eastern Continental Divide traverses the Virginia Tech Montgomery Executive Airport.

The tallest building in Blacksburg is Slusher Tower, a twelve-story residence hall on the Virginia Tech campus. The building with the highest elevation is actually Hoge Hall (formerly Lee Hall), another residence hall, which until May 17, 2009, was home to the transmitter of campus radio station WUVT. The tower for WUVT now sits atop Price Mountain.

=== Climate ===
Due to its elevation, the climate of Blacksburg is a hot-summer humid continental climate (Köppen climate classification: Dfa), being cooled down from the lowland areas of Virginia, all of which possess a humid subtropical climate (Köppen climate classification: Cfa). Summers are humid with warm to hot temperatures, although the area sees significantly cooler temperatures than places of lower elevation at the same latitude, with only 5 days of 90 °F (32 °C)+ highs annually. Winters are generally cool to cold, with occasional intervening warm periods and an average of 0.9 nights of sub-0 °F (−18 °C) lows. Monthly mean temperatures range from 31.9 °F (−0.1 °C) in January to 71.7 °F (22.1 °C) in July. Snowfall averages 24.7 inches (63 cm) per season and generally occurs from December to March, although significant snowfall has been recorded outside of those months.

Climate data for Blacksburg, Virginia (1991–2020 normals, extremes 1893–present)
Month	Jan	Feb	Mar	Apr	May	Jun	Jul	Aug	Sep	Oct	Nov	Dec	Year
Record high °F (°C)	75 (24)	80 (27)	86 (30)	95 (35)	93 (34)	99 (37)	100 (38)	99 (37)	97 (36)	94 (34)	82 (28)	75 (24)	100 (38)
Mean daily maximum °F (°C)	41.6 (5.3)	45.3 (7.4)	53.2 (11.8)	63.9 (17.7)	71.9 (22.2)	78.9 (26.1)	82.3 (27.9)	81.2 (27.3)	75.8 (24.3)	65.6 (18.7)	54.8 (12.7)	44.9 (7.2)	63.3 (17.4)
Daily mean °F (°C)	31.9 (−0.1)	34.7 (1.5)	41.7 (5.4)	51.4 (10.8)	60.2 (15.7)	67.9 (19.9)	71.7 (22.1)	70.4 (21.3)	64.3 (17.9)	53.2 (11.8)	42.7 (5.9)	35.1 (1.7)	52.1 (11.2)
Mean daily minimum °F (°C)	22.1 (−5.5)	24.1 (−4.4)	30.2 (−1.0)	38.9 (3.8)	48.4 (9.1)	56.9 (13.8)	61.0 (16.1)	59.5 (15.3)	52.9 (11.6)	40.9 (4.9)	30.7 (−0.7)	25.3 (−3.7)	40.9 (4.9)
Record low °F (°C)	−18 (−28)	−12 (−24)	−2 (−19)	10 (−12)	23 (−5)	30 (−1)	34 (1)	35 (2)	22 (−6)	13 (−11)	−1 (−18)	−27 (−33)	−27 (−33)
Average precipitation inches (mm)	3.23 (82)	2.83 (72)	3.78 (96)	3.77 (96)	4.47 (114)	4.27 (108)	4.21 (107)	3.57 (91)	3.45 (88)	2.91 (74)	2.85 (72)	3.30 (84)	42.64 (1,083)
Average snowfall inches (cm)	7.7 (20)	7.0 (18)	4.3 (11)	0.6 (1.5)	0.0 (0.0)	0.0 (0.0)	0.0 (0.0)	0.0 (0.0)	0.0 (0.0)	0.0 (0.0)	0.4 (1.0)	4.7 (12)	24.7 (63)
Average precipitation days (≥ 0.01 in)	11.3	10.5	12.2	12.5	13.7	12.3	12.9	11.5	9.4	9.1	9.0	11.7	136.1
Average snowy days (≥ 0.1 in)	3.9	4.6	2.7	0.6	0.0	0.0	0.0	0.0	0.0	0.1	0.6	2.8	15.3
Source: NOAA

== Transportation ==
=== Roads ===
Blacksburg is served primarily by US 460, a four-lane highway that connects I-81 at Christiansburg, 10 miles to the south, and to I-77 in Princeton, West Virginia. Driving from Blacksburg to its larger metro neighbor, Roanoke, via US 460 and I-81, usually requires less than an hour.

=== Public transportation ===
Blacksburg Transit provides bus transportation primarily to and from the campus of Virginia Tech. Since 2020, all passengers can ride BT fare-free. Virginia Tech subsidizes BT for this service. Blacksburg Transit also offers shuttle service on Virginia Tech Football game days free of charge from outlying parking areas to the stadium.

The Smart Way Bus, a regional commuter bus service operated by Valley Metro (Roanoke), provides connecting service between Virginia Tech, downtown Blacksburg, Christiansburg, Roanoke–Blacksburg Regional Airport, and Roanoke, where riders can transfer to an Amtrak train.

=== Air ===
At nearby Roanoke–Blacksburg Regional Airport, there are scheduled commercial flights to Atlanta, Charlotte, Chicago–O'Hare, New York–LaGuardia, Orlando/Sanford, Philadelphia, St. Petersburg/Clearwater, and Washington–Dulles, and there are seasonal charter flights to Atlantic City.

Virginia Tech Montgomery Executive Airport, located in the Town of Blacksburg, has general aviation, air taxi, and military flights.

== Demographics ==
Historical population
Census	Pop.	Note	%±
1880	688		—
1900	768		—
1910	875		13.9%
1920	1,095		25.1%
1930	1,406		28.4%
1940	2,133		51.7%
1950	3,358		57.4%
1960	7,070		110.5%
1970	9,384		32.7%
1980	30,638		226.5%
1990	34,590		12.9%
2000	39,573		14.4%
2010	42,620		7.7%
2020	44,826		5.2%
U.S. Decennial Census

=== 2020 census ===
As of the 2020 census, Blacksburg had a population of 44,826. The median age was 21.7 years. 10.5% of residents were under the age of 18 and 6.2% of residents were 65 years of age or older. For every 100 females there were 118.8 males, and for every 100 females age 18 and over there were 120.1 males age 18 and over.

96.9% of residents lived in urban areas, while 3.1% lived in rural areas.

There were 15,000 households in Blacksburg, of which 17.1% had children under the age of 18 living in them. Of all households, 24.7% were married-couple households, 38.4% were households with a male householder and no spouse or partner present, and 32.2% were households with a female householder and no spouse or partner present. About 30.9% of all households were made up of individuals and 4.6% had someone living alone who was 65 years of age or older.

There were 16,208 housing units, of which 7.5% were vacant. The homeowner vacancy rate was 1.2% and the rental vacancy rate was 3.5%.

Racial composition as of the 2020 census
Race	Number	Percent
White	31,792	70.9%
Black or African American	2,014	4.5%
American Indian and Alaska Native	67	0.1%
Asian	7,307	16.3%
Native Hawaiian and Other Pacific Islander	26	0.1%
Some other race	723	1.6%
Two or more races	2,897	6.5%
Hispanic or Latino (of any race)	2,612	5.8%

=== 2000 census ===
As of the 2000 census, there were 39,573 people, 13,162 households, and 4,777 families residing in the town. The population density was 2,044.2 people per square mile (789.2/km^{2}). There were 13,732 housing units at an average density of 709.4 per square mile (273.9/km^{2}). The racial makeup of the town was 84.39% White, 4.39% African American, 0.11% Native American, 7.80% Asian, 0.06% Pacific Islander, 0.90% from other races, and 2.36% from two or more races. Hispanic or Latino of any race were 2.32% of the population.

There were 13,162 households, out of which 16.3% had children under the age of 18 living with them, 28.7% were married couples living together, 5.3% had a female householder with no husband present, and 63.7% were non-families. 26.6% of all households were made up of individuals, and 3.7% had someone living alone who was 65 years of age or older. The average household size was 2.37 and the average family size was 2.79.

In the town, the population was spread out, with 9.7% under the age of 18, 57.4% from 18 to 24, 18.9% from 25 to 44, 9.2% from 45 to 64, and 4.9% who were 65 years of age or older. The median age was 22 years. For every 100 females, there were 127.0 males. For every 100 females age 18 and over, there were 129.7 males.

The median income for a household in the town was $22,513, and the median income for a family was $51,810. Males had a median income of $37,129 versus $24,321 for females. The per capita income for the town was $13,946. About 15.9% of families and 43.2% of the population were below the poverty line, including 23.7% of those under the age of 18 and 6.1% ages 65 or older.

=== Demographic estimates ===
The Metropolitan Statistical Area (MSA), which includes the town of Christiansburg, the independent city of Radford, and all of Montgomery, Pulaski, and Giles counties has an estimated population of 181,863 and is currently one of the faster-growing MSAs in Virginia.

About 87% of the town's residents have in-home Internet access with 65% using a broadband connection. Eighty-five percent of the community has a college education, seventy percent of which were graduates of Virginia Tech.

== Economy ==
The Virginia Tech Corporate Research Center is home to several companies of varying sizes including Honeywell, and the National Weather Service which maintains its Southwestern Virginia headquarters there. The town is also home to MOOG, a major supplier for the defense department and the health care industry and Rackspace, who acquired locally based Mailtrust/Webmail.us in 2007. The town and county continue to recruit major industry to the area.

=== Top employers ===
According to Blacksburg's 2022 Annual Comprehensive Financial Report, the top employers in the town are:

#	Employer	# of Employees
1	Virginia Tech	>5,000
2	Moog	>1,000
3	HCA Montgomery Regional Hospital	500 to 999
4	NRV Community Services	250 to 499
5	Town of Blacksburg	250 to 499
6	Eaglepicher Wolverine LLC	250 to 499
7	Spectrum (Tetra)	100 to 249
8	Federal-Mogul Corporation	100 to 249
9	Virginia Tech Services, Inc.	100 to 249
10	Luna Innovations	100 to 249

== Notable people ==
- Frank Beamer, former Head Football Coach at Virginia Tech
- James M. Buchanan, Nobel laureate
- Jack Champion, actor
- James Conrad, professional disc golfer, 2021 PDGA World Champion
- Thomas Nelson Conrad, Confederate spy
- Virginia Allen Crockford, school board educationalist
- Marc Edwards, civil engineering/environmental engineer and professor
- John B. Floyd, Governor of Virginia, U.S. Secretary of War, and Confederate general in the American Civil War
- Patri Friedman, activist and theorist of political economy
- Nikki Giovanni, poet
- Marjorie Glicksman Grene, philosopher
- Lanto Griffin, PGA Tour Golfer
- Kevin Jones, football player, highest recruit in Virginia Tech history
- Josh Kaufman, Season 6 winner of NBC's vocal competition show The Voice
- Henry Lee Lucas, serial killer
- William Milnes Maloy, Maryland state politician
- William Morva, murderer, last inmate executed by Commonwealth of Virginia
- Col. James Patton, early settler and first Augusta County Sheriff
- James Patton Preston, Governor of Virginia
- Col. William Preston, Burgess, Revolutionary War Colonel
- Thomas M. Price, American architect
- James I. Robertson Jr., historian and Alumni Distinguished Professor Emeritus at Virginia Tech
- Bob Roop, American heavyweight Greco-Roman wrestler
- Eric Schmidt, former Google CEO
- Ross Scott, YouTuber and activist
- Brandon Stokley, professional football player
- Wild Nothing, indie dream pop act
- Rick Devens, Reality TV show personality, Big Brother Season 28 Winner

== Points of interest ==
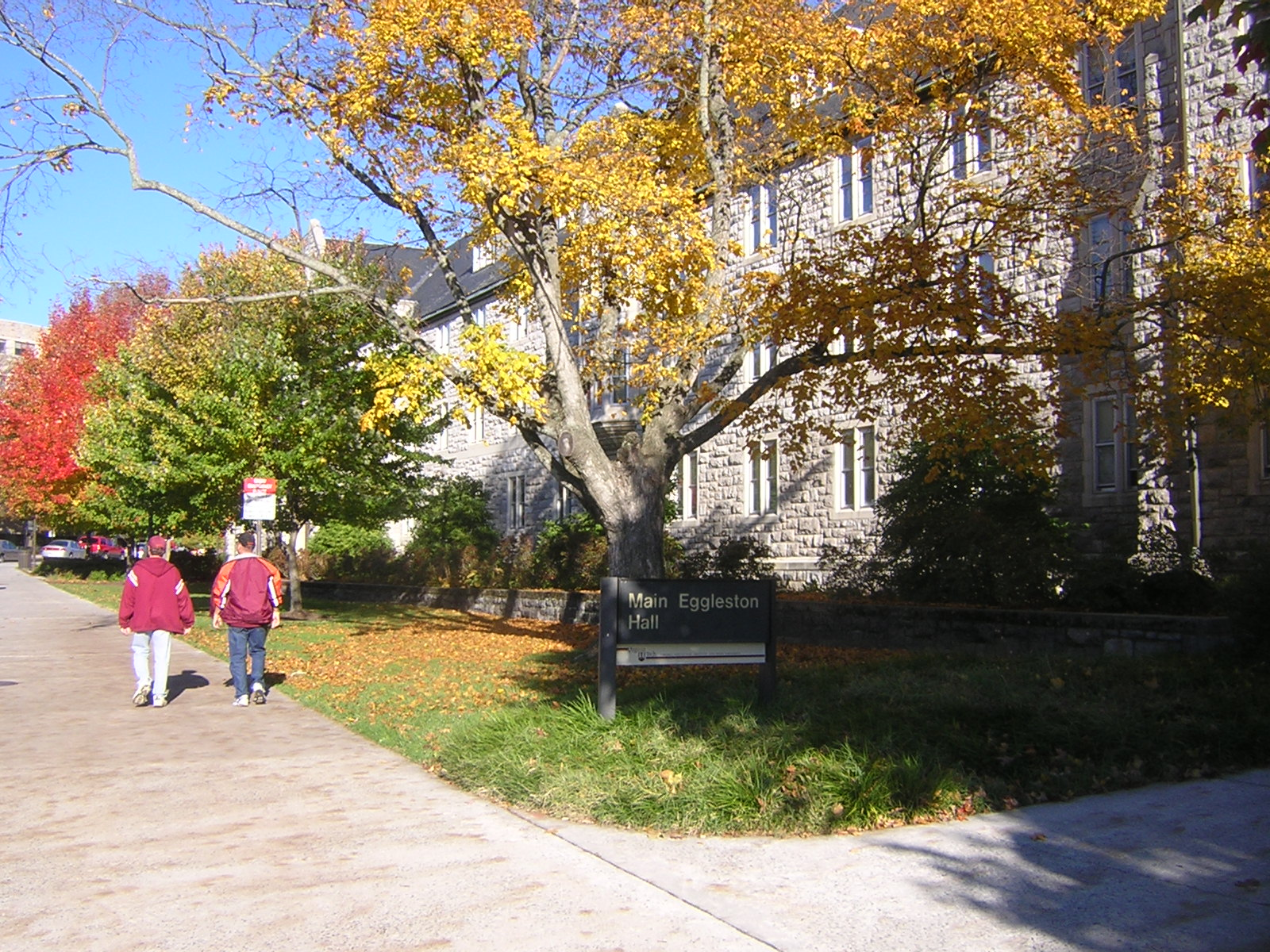
Blacksburg is the home of Virginia Tech

- 16 Squares
- Alexander Black House
- Armory Art Gallery
- Blacksburg Farmers Market
- Edward Via College of Osteopathic Medicine
- Hahn Horticulture Garden
- Huckleberry Trail
- Lyric Theatre
- Moss Arts Center
- Municipal (Caboose) Park
- Smithfield Plantation
- Virginia Polytechnic Institute and State University (Virginia Tech)
- Hokie House

== Annual town events ==
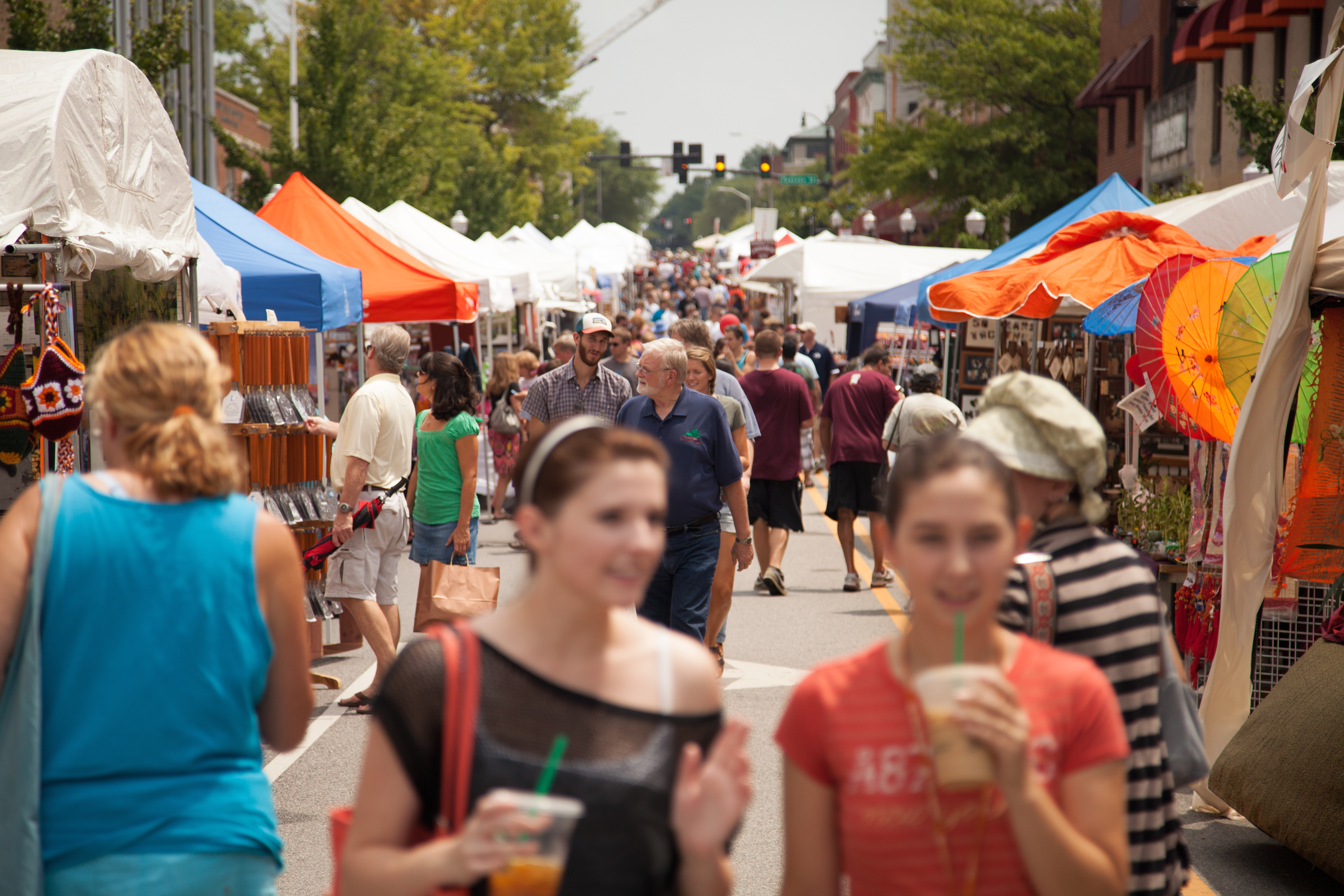
Downtown Blacksburg during Steppin' Out.

- The International Street Fair held in downtown Blacksburg and on the Virginia Tech campus takes place in spring. Over 110 countries are represented by the student body of Virginia Tech and individuals from the community during the festival. There are food trucks, country booths, and the stage features an eclectic mix of melodies and musical performances from around the world.
- Steppin' Out, the town's first annual street festival, has taken place on the first Friday and Saturday of every August since 1976 when it was known as the Deadwood Days Summer Festival. Because of a murder associated with the final Deadwood Days in August 1979, the festival's name was changed in 1980 and Steppin' Out began in 1981. Steppin' Out features over 150 artists and crafts people from around the United States selling unique handcrafted items, local merchants holding final clearance sidewalk sales, local restaurants selling food through outdoor vending, multiple stages for live performances, and fun for the entire family. The area from North Main Street and Alumni Mall (sometimes even more to the north) to South Main Street and Roanoke Street and Draper Road and Lee Street is designated for the festival. The Draper Mile Run, which was started in 1982, is a one-mile (1.6 km) road race for runners of all ages that is held annually during the first evening of the festival.
- Summer Solstice Fest takes place on the Saturday afternoon/evening closest to the solstice. Downtown Blacksburg Inc. organizes the event, which includes live music, vendors, a dog parade and 5k race.
- Sustainability Week is held in mid-September and is a collaboration between Sustainable Blacksburg, the Town of Blacksburg, and Virginia Tech's Office of Energy & Sustainability. First held in 2007, the tagline, "Celebrate. Educate. Motivate." The events emphasize how to become a more sustainable community.
- The Winter Lights Festival is held the first Friday in December. College Avenue is closed for caroling, vendors, Santa at the Lyric, and the tree lighting on Virginia Tech's Henderson Lawn. The evening ends with the annual Holiday Parade which goes from Virginia Tech's campus to Eheart Street.

== Sister City ==
Blacksburg's sister city is San José de Bocay, in the mountains of northern Nicaragua.
