= Virginia Allen Crockford =

American educationalist(1917 – 2001)

- Born: 1917; Blacksburg, Virginia
- Died: March 24, 2001 (aged 83–84)
- Occupation: educationalist
- Spouse: W. Hamilton Crockford III
- Children: 1 daughter & 1 son

Virginia Allen Crockford (1917 – March 24, 2001) was an American educationalist. She was a member of the Richmond School Board from 1962 to 1972, and served as board chair from 1968 to 1972.

== Personal history ==
Born in 1917 in Blacksburg, Virginia, she had two brothers. She married W. Hamilton Crockford III and had one daughter, one son and four grandchildren.

Virginia Crockford was a member of the Richmond School Board from 1962 to 1972, and was the chairman from 1968 to 1972. She was the second woman to serve on the board and its only female member at the time. She served as the board chairman from 1968 to 1972.

She was president of the Richmond and the State PTA's, the League of Women Voters, the Central Virginia Health System's Agency, a member of the Virginia Health Planning Agency, a founder of the Volunteers and Juvenile Courts Project, a trustee of the Virginia Commonwealth University (VCU) School of Social Work, and was active in many other civic, educational and health-related organizations in the city, state and nationally.

== Bringing sex education to Virginia Public Schools ==
Before 1954, there were no official State regulations or policies on sex education as a separate aspect of the Virginia public school curriculum. Teachers were not certified for the purpose of offering sex education instruction, nor were there courses in sex education, as such. approved or offered in Virginia. Instruction on sex education was covered in related courses such as biology or health education. At the August 1954 meeting of the Virginia State Board of Education, the Board adopted a regulation requiring public schools and libraries to obtain Board approval before using or circulating any materials related to sex education. Two months later, the Board amended the regulation to specify that textbooks, film and audio visual aid materials, books and pamphlets all required prior approval by the Board. Localities could decide on using sex education materials in their curriculum and could still cover such materials in biology or health courses. In 1963, as increasing interest in teaching sex education generated more requests for Board approval of teaching materials, the Department of Education issued a new 3-step review process. Local school officials would forward materials they had approved to the Department of Education which would decide whether or not to forward the material to the Textbook and Curriculum Committee of the State Board of Education. The Board's decision would then be reported to the local school district. The State followed this procedure for 16 years until 1970 when "growing public interest in this topic was reflected in the introduction of several bills during the 1970 General Assembly to curtail or regulate sex education in the public schools."

At its August 1970 meeting, the State Board of Education adopted new regulations, procedures and formal guidelines for sex education in Virginia public schools. One of the most important changes specifies that "any instructional program involving sex education should be developed with considerable citizen, parent-teacher association and parental review of the materials to be used and of the type of program to be offered." It also addressed certification standards for teachers of family life and sex education. During this time of considerable progress in advancing sex education as a valuable part of public education, Crockford was serving as Chairman of the Richmond School Board, and although no specifics of her contributions to the effort appear in readily available publications, Richmond public schools did expand and improve sex and family life education offered to its students during her tenure. During this time 15 counties and 12 cities in Virginia had established courses in family life and sex education. Also, as president of the Richmond and the State PTA's, Crockford led local and state efforts to promote the position of the National Congress of Parents and Teachers on sex education in public schools: "Over and over again the PTA has expressed the belief that sound education about sexuality is basic if children are to understand human development, cope with the stresses and pressures of adolescence in modern America, and become adults capable of successful marriage and responsible parenthood."

Crockford and many school officials and school board members and others pushing for a sound sex education program in schools faced strong opposition from many right-wing conservative groups. In September 1968, The Christian Crusade launched a direct mail campaign against family life and sex education. The John Birch Society strongly supported the attack and launched many of its own attacks via various media. Crockford and others contended that much of the controversy stemmed from sensationalism and misinformation.

== Supporting desegregation of Richmond schools ==
Crockford was not only a strong proponent of sex education in public schools, but she was also an outspoken advocate of desegregation in Richmond schools. She even received death threats for her views. Crockford is credited as a contributor to the book The Color of Their Skin: Education and Race in Richmond Virginia, 1954-89 by Robert A. Pratt.

== Legacy ==
Virginia Crockford's papers are housed at the James Branch Cabell Library at Virginia Commonwealth University. Her collection includes documents about her work on the City of Richmond School Board (1962–1972) and on the steering committee of the Richmond Tomorrow strategic planning group (1989–1993).
