= LewisGale Hospital Montgomery =

Coordinates: 37°11′14.6″N 80°24′40.6″W

- Hospital Corporation of America

Geography
- Location: Blacksburg, Virginia, U.S.

Organisation
- Care system: LewisGale Regional Health System
- Type: Community
- Affiliated university: None

Services
- Emergency department: III
- Beds: 146

History
- Opened: 1910

Links
- Website: LewisGale Hospital Montgomery

LewisGale Hospital Montgomery, formerly Montgomery Regional Hospital (MRH), is a hospital in the town of Blacksburg, in Montgomery County, Virginia. The hospital is a subsidiary of Hospital Corporation of America.

== History ==
LewisGale Hospital Montgomery, opened in 1971, is a 146-bed general acute-care facility certified as a level III trauma center. The facility replaced Altamont Hospital, which was opened in 1910 in neighboring Christiansburg as a privately owned hospital with 12 beds. The hospital was expanded to 20 beds in 1923 by its founder, Dr. A. M. Showalter. In 1967, the hospital was reorganized into a community hospital and was renamed for its founder as the A.M. Showalter Memorial Hospital. In 1969, pursuant to the efforts of the Showalter administrator, James Sublett, Hospital Corporation of America (HCA) provided financing for construction of the current facility. After several name changes and transfers of ownership, the facility was renamed LewisGale Hospital Montgomery in 2010, as part of HCA's LewisGale Regional Health System.

=== 2006 shooting ===
On August 20, 2006, William Morva shot and killed Derrick McFarland, a security guard in the emergency department at Montgomery Regional Hospital (MRH). Morva had been in jail awaiting trial on an attempted robbery charge, but was taken to MRH after sustaining a sprained ankle and wrist while in jail. After using the restroom, he attacked the security guard and a Montgomery County Sheriff's deputy. Morva escaped the emergency department, but was captured the next day. While escaping capture, he shot and killed Montgomery County sheriff's Cpl. Eric Sutphin on the morning of August 21.

=== Virginia Tech shooting ===
The hospital received several patients that were wounded in the Virginia Tech shooting on April 16, 2007.
