= Preston and Olin Institute =

Former Methodist school in Virginia, US

Coordinates: 37°13′55″N 80°25′5″W

The Preston and Olin Institute was a Methodist academy for boys in Blacksburg, Virginia which operated from 1851 to 1872. They chose the name Preston for Colonel William Ballard Preston, of nearby Smithfield Plantation, a well-known Montgomery County businessman, farmer, and statesman and a nationally known politician. The Methodist Church selected the name Olin after Stephen Olin, a beloved Methodist minister and former president of Randolph-Macon College. Olin and Preston Institute, a school for boys, opened in 1851, with William R. White as principal. The town already had a school for girls: the Blacksburg Female Academy, incorporated by legislative act in 1840. Until it was rechartered in 1869, it was named The Olin and Preston Institute.

The institute fell into financial trouble in its later years and in 1872, in conjunction with strong lobbying by local residents and its principal, Thomas Nelson Conrad, the academy was selected to be reorganized as the Virginia Agricultural and Mechanical College (now Virginia Tech), the state's primary land grant institution under the Morrill Land-Grant Colleges Act. Due to the specific stipulations in the Morrill Act regarding racial equality, the new institution had to be either racially integrated or the state had to establish a second institution for people of color. Virginia chose the latter, and as such, the newly founded Virginia Agricultural and Mechanical College would receive only two-thirds of the land grant funding, and the remaining one-third went to Hampton Institute a black college in Hampton. In 1920 the Commonwealth transferred the black land grant funding to the Virginia Normal and Collegiate Institute (now Virginia State University) in Petersburg, Virginia, an institution organized for African-Americans, and Virginia's first state-supported historically black college.

== Preston and Olin Building ==
The Preston and Olin building was originally constructed 1855 as a three-story, 100 x 40-ft. red brick edifice located on a hill facing Main Street in Blacksburg. The building contained three recitation rooms, a chapel, and 24 lodging rooms. During the Civil War, Major General George Crook occupied the building as his headquarters when his federal troops passed through Blacksburg following the Battle of Cloyd's Mountain. At the time, the building was empty because the school had closed due to the war. After the founding of the Virginia Agricultural and Mechanical College, the Preston and Olin building was used as a dormitory until 1888.

After students moved into Barracks No. 1 (now known as Lane Hall), the Preston and Olin building was remodeled and converted into the Machine Shop, and two additions, the last completed in 1904, were made forming a quadrangle. In the early morning hours of June 14, 1913, the Preston and Olin building caught fire and burned to the ground. The area where the Preston and Olin building once stood on the Virginia Tech campus is now the site of the Moss Arts Center.
