= Virginia Tech Montgomery Executive Airport =

Coordinates: 37°12′28″N 080°24′28″W

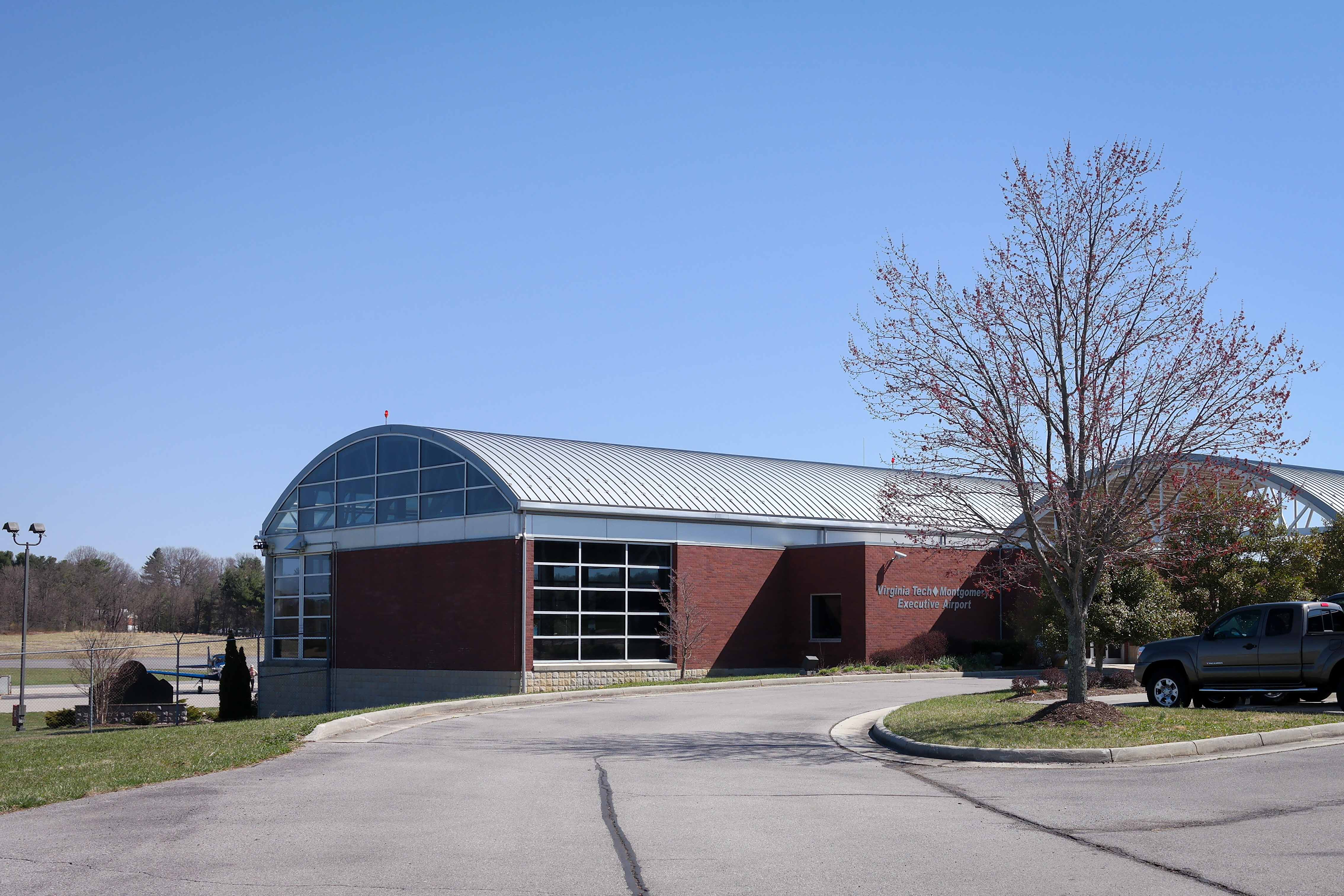
- IATA: BCB; ICAO: KBCB; FAA LID: BCB

Summary
- Airport type: Public
- Owner: Virginia Tech Montgomery Regional Airport Authority
- Serves: Blacksburg, Virginia
- Elevation AMSL: 2,120 ft / 646 m
- Website: www.vtmea.com
- Interactive map of Virginia Tech Montgomery Executive Airport

Runways
Direction	Length		Surface
Direction	ft	m	Surface
13/31	5,500	1,700	Asphalt

Statistics (2020)
- Aircraft operations: 16,700
- Source: Federal Aviation Administration

Virginia Tech Montgomery Executive Airport (IATA: BCB, ICAO: KBCB, FAA LID: BCB) is a public airport named for nearby Virginia Tech and located three miles (5 km) south of the central business district of Blacksburg, a town in Montgomery County, Virginia, United States.

== Facilities and aircraft ==
Virginia Tech Montgomery Executive Airport covers an area of 248 acres (100 ha) and contains one asphalt paved runway, designated 13/31 and measuring 5500 x 100 ft (1,700 x 30 m).

For the period ending August 1, 2020, the airport had 16,700 aircraft operations, an average of 45 per day: 96% general aviation, 2% air taxi and 2% military. BCB is an instrument flight rules airport with GPS approaches to both runways, a LOC/DME approach to runway 12, a non-precision NDB approach, and an automated weather observing system (AWOS-3).

The airport officially opened in 1931 as VPI Airport (Virginia Tech was previously abbreviated VPI). University cadets trained to fly there during World War II. A new terminal building was completed in 1996, and the airport took its current name in 2002.
