= Claytor =

Claytor is a surname. Notable people with the surname include:

- Christian J. Claytor (2003–Present), American Colligate Track and Feild Pole Vaulter
- Gertrude Harris Boatwright Claytor (1888–1973), American poet
- Robert B. Claytor (1922–1993), American railroad administrator
- W. Graham Claytor (1886–1971), of Roanoke, Virginia, vice president of Appalachian Power Company, an electric utility service
- W. Graham Claytor Jr. (1912–1994), American lawyer, naval officer, and railroad, transportation and defense administrator for the US government
- William Schieffelin Claytor (1908–1967), third African-American to get a PhD in mathematics

== See also ==
- Claytor Lake, 21 mile long reservoir in Pulaski County, Virginia on the New River created for a hydroelectric project of Appalachian Power Company
- Claytor Lake State Park in Pulaski County, Virginia is located on Claytor Lake
- Miller–Claytor House, historic home located at Riverside Park in Lynchburg, Virginia
