= Dunkard's Bottom, Virginia =

Historic religious community in colonial Virginia, USA

Dunkard's Bottom Mahanaim
- Historic colonial Virginia community
- Etymology: Hebrew: Mahanaim "Two Camps"
- Location of Dunkard's Bottom in Virginia, US Dunkard's Bottom (the United States)
- Coordinates: 37°03′43″N 80°37′25″W
- Founded: 1745
- Abandoned: 1753

Population
  - Estimate (1748): 50−150

Dunkard's Bottom (sometimes written Dunkard Bottom, Dunkert Bottom, or Dunker Bottom, originally named Mahanaim) was a Schwarzenau Brethren religious community in the colony of Virginia in British America. It was established on the New River in the mid-1740s by brothers Samuel, Gabriel and Israel Eckerlin and Alexander Mack Jr. It flourished for only a few years until most of the settlers decided to return to Pennsylvania because living conditions at Dunkard's Bottom were too harsh. The Eckerlins sold their property in 1753 and moved to what is now West Virginia. The property changed hands several times until the construction of the Claytor Dam in 1939, which submerged the area of Dunkard's Bottom under Claytor Lake.

== Establishment, 1745 ==
Samuel, Gabriel and Israel Eckerlin were members of the German Baptist Brethren community in Ephrata, Pennsylvania, who, in the mid-1740s, had a conflict with the community's founder, Conrad Beissel. The Eckerlins had immigrated to Pennsylvania along with other Anabaptists from the Schwarzenau, Wittgenstein community of modern-day Bad Berleburg, North Rhine-Westphalia, in what was then the Holy Roman Empire. Israel Eckerlin heard Beissel speak and was baptized in 1728. He and his brothers moved to the Ephrata Cloister in 1729. By the early 1740s, the Eckerlins had become community leaders and decided to make the community self-sufficient by planting an orchard, building a mill and starting a workshop for the manufacture of cloth. In 1742 Samuel purchased a printing press and printed a number of books, including John Bunyan's Pilgrim's Progress, as well as several other works in German. Israel, who had been appointed prior of the cloister, wanted to construct a bell tower. Beissel felt that he was being marginalized as a leader and objected to these innovations. On 14 September 1745, following an angry confrontation, the Eckerlins and their colleague Alexander Mack Jr. (son of Alexander Mack, first minister of the Schwarzenau Brethren) left the community to establish their own settlement in Virginia.

=== Mahanaim ===
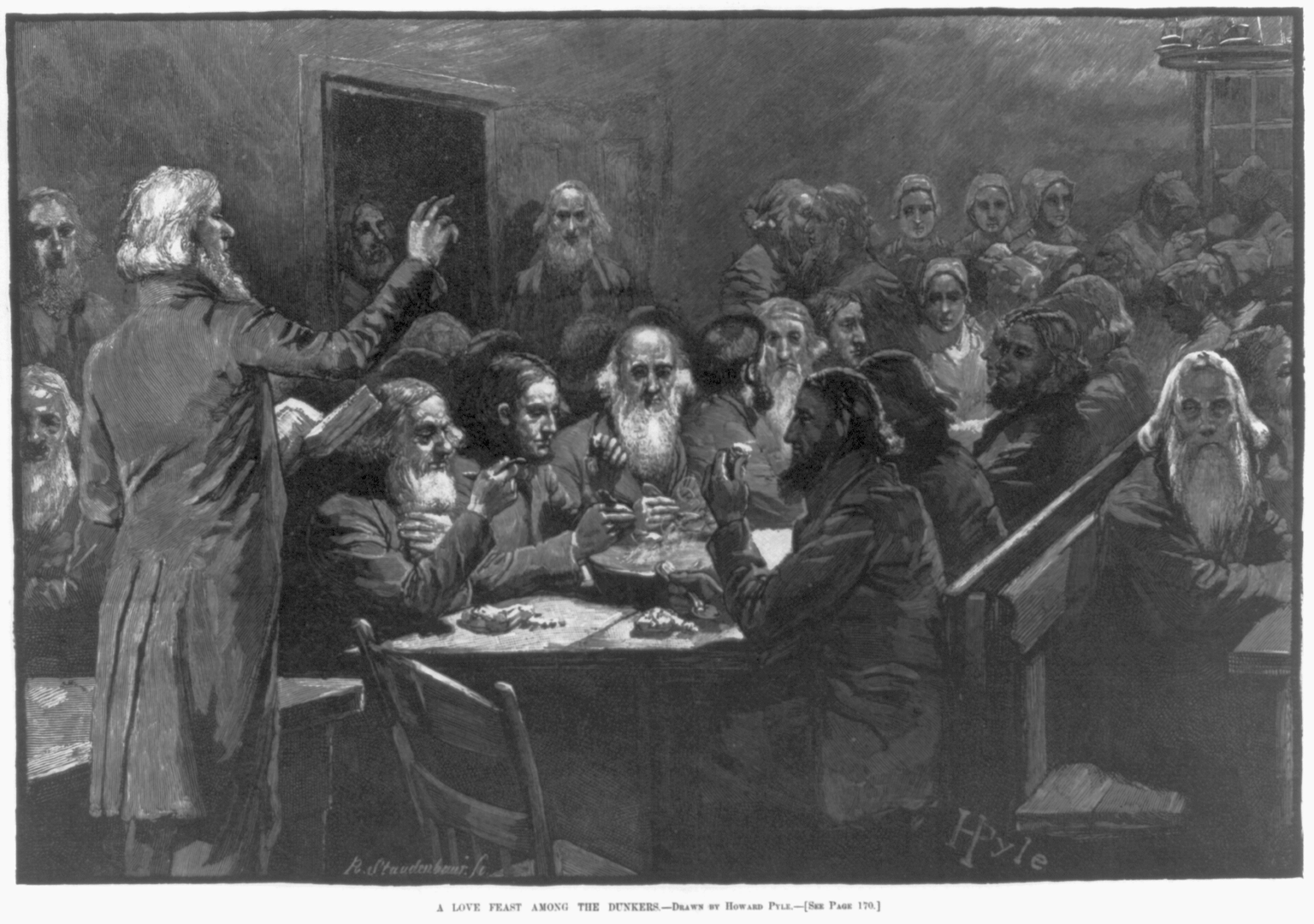
Traditional religious Love Feast among the Schwarzenau Brethren.

The Eckerlins purchased 900 acres in the New River Valley, in an area where other German immigrants had already settled, including Samuel Stalnaker, and Jacob and Adam Harman (formerly Hermann). They quickly built cabins and named the new settlement "Mahanaim," from a verse in the Book of Genesis where Jacob had a vision of angels and named the place Mahanaim, Hebrew for "Two Camps", or "Two Companies". They also built the first mill on the New River, intending to make the community economically self-sufficient in order to attract new settlers. The Eckerlins sought a remote location to escape the interference of civil authorities into their religious practices, but they also knew that their location near a main river would make the community accessible to traders and other visitors.

The Eckerlins were unaware, however, that the land they had purchased was part of a 100,000 acre grant to the Wood's River Company, administered by Colonel James Patton. Patton's agent, John Buchanan arrived in October 1745 to survey the area and discovered the community. He and Patton were then able to work out a deal with the Eckerlins to allow them to keep their land. Buchanan returned to survey the land in 1747.

Soon after this, the Eckerlins returned to Pennsylvania to purchase supplies, and persuaded a number of residents in Ephrata to move to Mahanaim. By early 1746, new cabins had been built with limestone chimneys constructed by an itinerant Irish stonemason. There was no church, as worship and traditional love feasts took place in homes designed with open interiors for this purpose. A second mill was built and roads were extended towards Staunton and other communities. Local settlers referred to the community as "Dunkard's Bottom." The Brethren were known as "Dunkards" from the German Tunkers, after the Schwarzenau Brethren's tradition of triple immersion baptism.

On 16 March 1750, Mahanaim was visited by Dr. Thomas Walker at the very start of Walker's trip west into what is now Kentucky. Walker wrote in his journal that he passed the mill:

lately built by the Sect of People who call themselves of the Brotherhood of Euphrates, and are commonly called the Duncards, who are the upper Inhabitants of the New River, which is about 400 yards wide at this place. They live on the west side, and we were obliged to swim our horses over. The Duncards are an odd set of people, who make it a matter of Religion not to Shave their Beards, ly on beds, or eat flesh, though at present, in the last, they transgress, being constrained to it, they say, by the want of a sufficiency of Grain and Roots, they have not long been seated here...The unmarried have no Property but live on a common Stock. They don't baptize either Young or Old, they keep their Sabbath on Saturday, and hold that all men shall be happy hereafter, but first must pass through punishment according to their Sins. They are very hospitable.

== Dissolution, 1753 ==
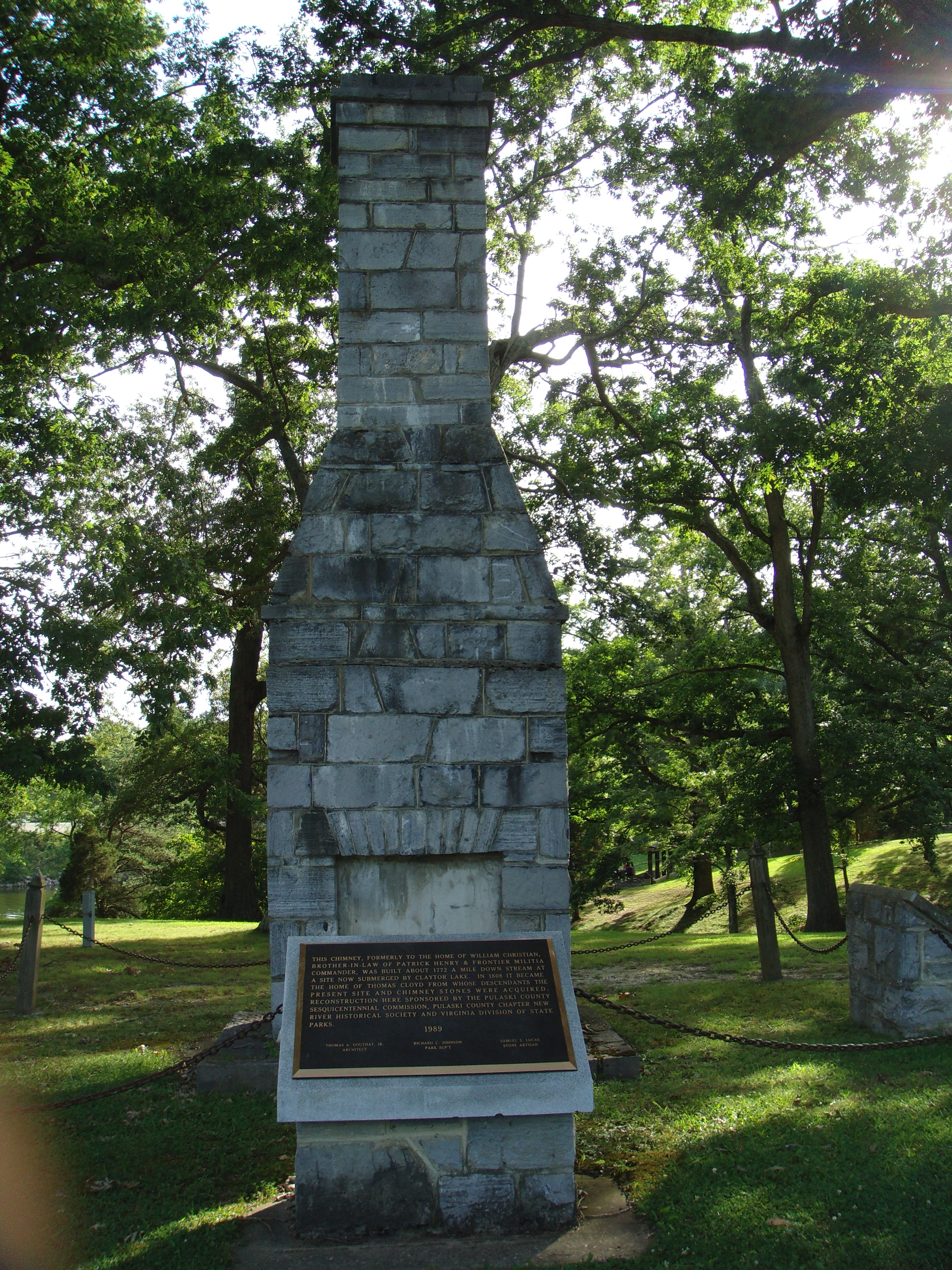
Chimney from the home of William Christian, built in 1772. The stones were relocated when the dam inundated the site, and this monument was erected at Claytor Lake State Park by the New River Historical Society and the Virginia Division of State Parks.

In spite of its strong start, within a few years residents started returning to Pennsylvania, discouraged by the harsh winters, isolation and growing tension with Native Americans in the area, who would steal corn from their fields at harvest time, leaving them with little food for the winter. Gabriel hunted to provide meat, however the Brethren were vegetarians and felt that hunting was contrary to their beliefs. In February 1750, Israel and Gabriel returned to Ephrata but were unable to persuade any new settlers to return with them to Virginia.

In 1751, the Eckerlins decided to relocate their community to the west, but this time they sought the permission of Native Americans already living in the area, so that in the future they would not be raided or harassed. Israel traveled to Logstown to meet with George Croghan, and requested leave of the Iroquois Confederacy to settle on the Youghiogheny River. He was told that he would need the permission of the Onondaga Council. Doubtful that the council would agree, the Eckerlin brothers met with Christopher Gist who was Land Agent for the Ohio Company of Virginia. He permitted them to settle on a tract of land along the Monongahela River.

In 1753 Samuel Eckerlin sold portions of the Dunkard's Bottom land to Gerhard (Garrett) Zinn and William Davis. The Eckerlin brothers reestablished themselves in a new community, referred to as Dunkard Bottom on the Cheat River in what is now Preston County, West Virginia. This new settlement was destroyed by Indians in 1757. Gabriel and Israel were captured, sold to the French and sent to France, where they died. Samuel Eckerlin escaped and set up a medical practice in Strasburg, Virginia. In 1764 he returned to Ephrata, seeking to claim his rights to the land the cloister was built on, and for which the original 1739 deed still existed. The Pennsylvania Supreme Court recognized him as the rightful owner of Ephrata. In 1770 he sold the land back to the Brethren for only five shillings.

== Subsequent years ==
In 1755, some 28 individuals were killed or taken captive due to continued attacks by Natives in the vicinity of New Creek. In 1756, William Ingles purchased 900 acres of land in the area and established a farm with his wife Mary Draper Ingles, after their home in the nearby community of Draper's Meadow was destroyed during an attack by Shawnee Indians. They assisted in the construction of a small fort there, probably no more than a blockhouse, which was later named Fort Frederick. In February 1756, 140 Cherokee warriors allied with the British gathered at Dunkard's Bottom before joining the Sandy Creek Expedition. The Ingles abandoned their farm after only a few months and in June, 1756 they relocated to Fort Vause, seeking protection from raids during the French and Indian War. In 1760, Ingles established Ingles Ferry a few miles away. He sold his land at Dunkard's Bottom to William Christian in 1771.

Christian built a comfortable home there in 1772, where his father Israel Christian died in 1784. Planning to move west to Kentucky, he sold his home and land to settlers in 1785. The land was purchased and developed as a plantation by Thomas Cloyd starting in the early 1800s. Thomas Cloyd lived in one of the earlier German settlement houses until his large 2-story, 3-bay brick house was finished in 1847. The stone fireplace and foundation of at least one other Dunkard cottage remained and were used for the construction of a tenant house for plantation laborers in the late nineteenth century. The land remained in the Cloyd family for three generations until the construction of the Claytor Dam in 1939, which inundated the site of Dunkard's Bottom, along with the remains of the Christian home and the Cloyd mansion, under Claytor Lake. The limestone chimneys of the Eckerlin's cabins were still standing when the lake covered them.

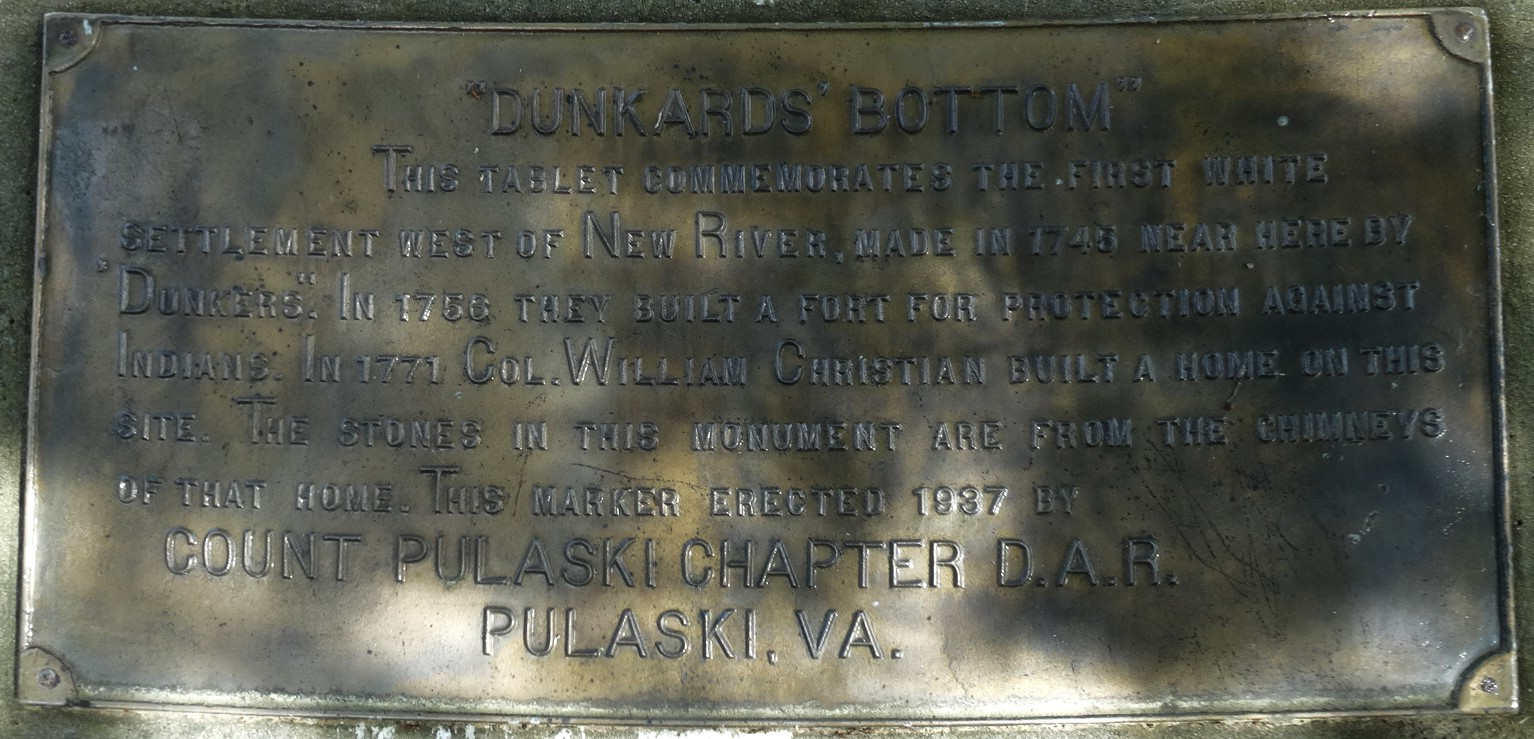
Plaque at Claytor Lake State Park commemorating the Dunkard's Bottom community.

== Memorialization ==
A historical marker on a stone plinth was placed in 1937 at the site of the original community, by the Count Pulaski Chapter of the DAR. It was moved to what is now Claytor Lake State Park after the site was submerged. A second plaque commemorating the home of William Christian, was placed beside the relocated limestone chimney in 1989, by the Pulaski County Sesquicentennial Commission, Pulaski County Chapter New River Historical Society and Virginia Division of State Parks.
