= Robert B. Claytor =

American railroad executive

Robert Buckner Claytor (February 27, 1922 – April 9, 1993) was an American railroad administrator. He became president of the Norfolk and Western Railway in 1981 and was instrumental in the merger of the Southern Railway and the Norfolk & Western in 1982. He was the first chairman and CEO of the new Norfolk Southern, and is credited with locating the headquarters of the Fortune 500 company in Norfolk, Virginia, within sight of the massive coal pier at Lambert's Point on the Elizabeth River at Hampton Roads.

Robert B. Claytor is best remembered by many railfans for continuing the Southern's steam program, which went on to rebuild steam locomotives J class No. 611 and A class No. 1218 and operated excursion trips. He occasionally took the helm as engineer with his brother, W. Graham Claytor Jr., who had been president of Southern Railway (U.S.) and later, CEO of Amtrak.

He was the son of W. Graham Claytor (1886-1971), who as vice president of Appalachian Power Company supervised the construction of Claytor Dam and creation of a 4,500 acre (18 km^{2}), 21 mile (34 km) long lake on the New River at Claytor Lake State Park in Virginia, and of Gertrude Harris Boatwright Claytor, a poet. One of his brothers, W. Graham Claytor Jr. (1912-1994), was president of the Southern Railway from 1967 to 1977, a United States Deputy Secretary of Defense and Secretary of the Navy from 1977 to 1979 under President Jimmy Carter, an acting U.S. Secretary of Transportation in the cabinet of President Carter in 1979, and president of Amtrak from 1982 until 1993.

Robert B. Claytor died of cancer on April 9, 1993, at his home in Norfolk.

"The Claytor Brothers: Virginians Building America's Railroad" is a semi-permanent exhibit at the Virginia Museum of Transportation in Roanoke, Virginia.

== See also ==
- List of railroad executives
