= Dunkard's Bottom =

Dunkard's Bottom or Dunkard Bottom may refer to the following places in the United States:

- Dunkard's Bottom, Virginia, established on the New River in 1745, submerged under Claytor Lake 1939
- Dunkard Bottom, West Virginia, established on the Cheat River in 1753

== See also ==
- Camp Dawson (West Virginia)
