= Dunkard =

Dunkard may refer to:

- Dunkards, colloquial name for the Schwarzenau Brethren, a German Anabaptist group founded 1708
- Dunkard Township, Greene County, Pennsylvania, administrative territorial subdivision in the United States
- Dunkard Creek, stream in Greene County, Pennsylvania and Monongalia County, West Virginia

== See also ==
- Dunkard's Bottom (disambiguation)
- Dunkard Brethren Church, a denomination of the Schwarzenau Brethren tradition organized in 1926
