= Scoutreach =

Division of the Boy Scouts of America

- Owner: Boy Scouts of America
- Headquarters: Irving, Texas
- Country: United States
- Founded: 1994
- Website scoutreachbsa.org

Scoutreach was a division of the Boy Scouts of America that emphasized service to rural and urban areas and to minority populations. It became the All Markets Strategy.

The African American Focus works with African American populations in partnerships with the NAACP, various African American churches and other groups. The Hispanic/Latino Focus includes the ¡Scouting - Vale La Pena! emphasis for Hispanic youth that provides Spanish language resources such as handbooks, training material, and videos. The Soccer and Scouting emphasis is a partnership with the National Soccer Coaches Association of America to provide alternatives for Cub Scout age Hispanic youth. The Asian American Focus reaches out to Indo-Chinese American, Vietnamese American, Chinese American, and Korean American communities. The Rural Scouting focus targets small communities and includes the American Indian Scouting Association in partnership with the Girl Scouts of the USA.

In 2004, the Scoutreach division launched the Scouting and Soccer program with an emphasis on outreach to Hispanic/Latino youth and families.

== History ==
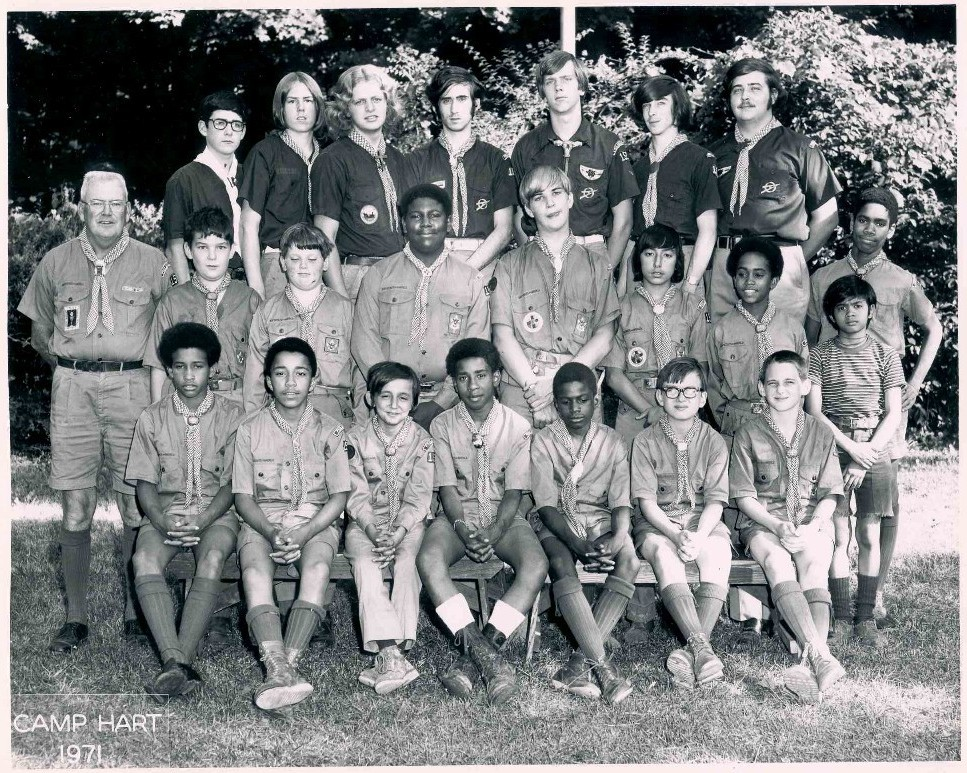
An integrated Scout troop from Philadelphia, at Camp Hart in 1971

Protests over the inclusion of African Americans arose early in the program. When W.D. Boyce departed the organization, he turned the Boy Scout corporation over to the members of the executive board with the stipulation that the Boy Scouts would not discriminate on the basis of race or creed. The BSA accepted Boyce's condition, yet by the 1914 Annual Meeting, it adopted a policy allowing local councils to deny membership to African Americans. One segregated council (Old Hickory Council, North Carolina) completed its integration plans in 1974, merging two white districts and one black district ten years after the passage of the federal civil rights act.

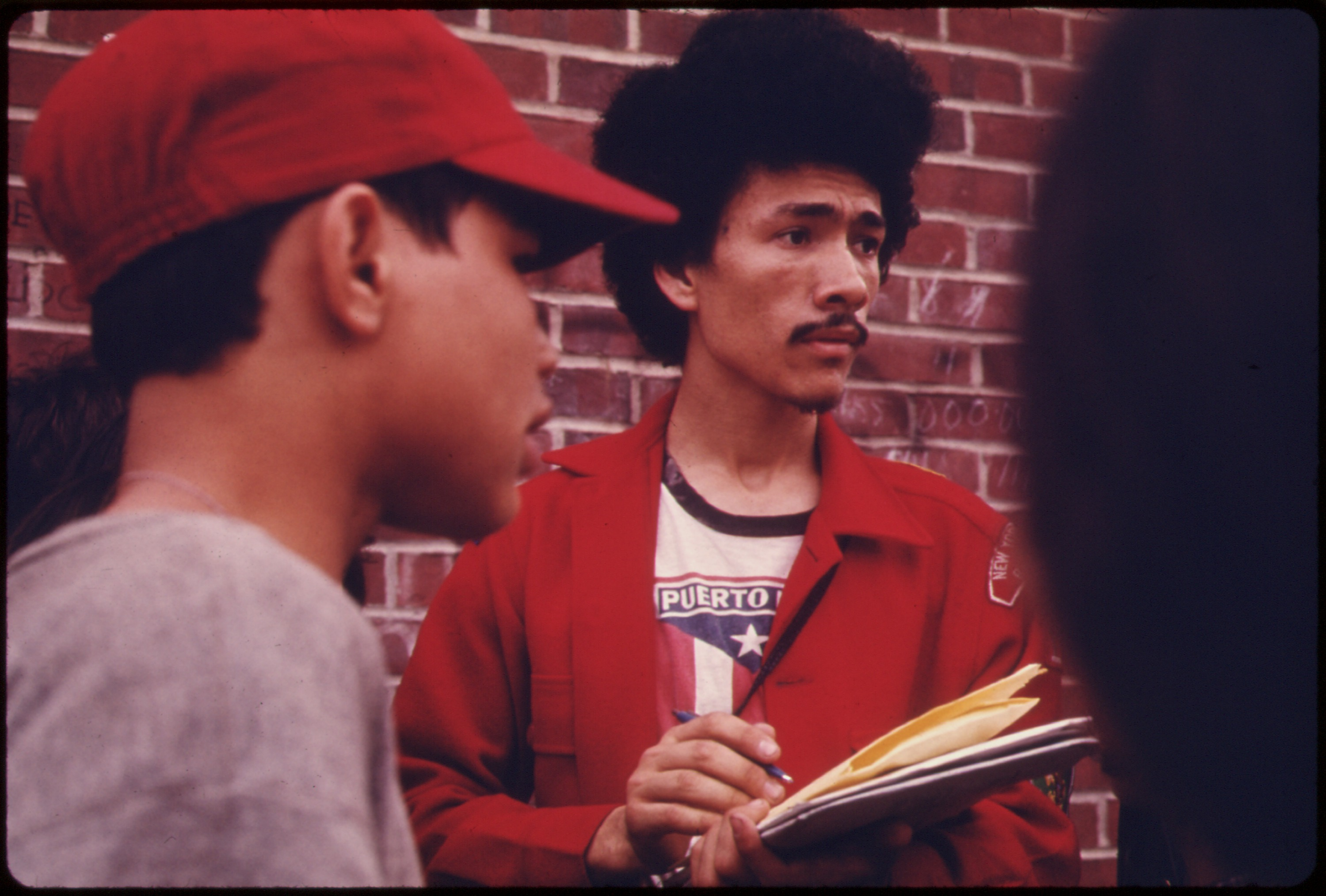
Scout leader recruiting Latino youth in New York City

The BSA began expanding the Negro Scouting program: by 1927 thirty-two communities in the south had "colored troops", with twenty-six troops in Louisville, Kentucky. Based on the work in the Chickasaw Council in Memphis, Bolton Smith directed the creation of the BSA's "National Committee on Inter-Racial Activities." This committee coordinated the creation of African American Scout troops. For this he was elected a national vice-president. Some councils, like the Piedmont Area Council would run segregated programs, or camps. Piedmont once ran two camps near Lynchburg, Camp Tye Brook and Camp Bolton Smith. The former for white scouts, and the latter for black.

During its first fifty years, the BSA struggled with minority communities because they were not seen as a source of strong membership. At the end of the 1960s, the national leadership saw the underserved communities, primarily in urban areas, and created their new "Urban Emphasis." Scouting in the South remained largely segregated until World War II. The BSA's modernization and new "urban emphasis" was consistent with similar trends in Scouting all over the world starting in the 1960s. Much of these changes could be seen in the 8th Edition of the Boy Scout Handbook used from 1972 to 1979. The Urban Emphasis program, and some other Hispanic outreach initiatives, were the forerunner of today's "Scoutreach."

Since the adoption of the 1914 racial policy, the African American community has struggled to allow African Americans to join the BSA and then endured segregated facilities and programs. Even after the Brown decision in 1954 and the Civil Rights Act of 1964, the BSA refused to reject its 1914 racial policy. It was an NAACP 1974 lawsuit against the LDS and the BSA which finally forced the BSA to issue a non-discrimination policy on the basis of race. Scoutreach is an effort to help overcome past problems in the program.

== Related programs ==
=== Council-level Scoutreach programs ===
While Scoutreach at the national level has been disbanded, many local Scouts BSA councils retain some form of Scoutreach program. These programs vary significantly depending on the council. For instance, the Sam Houston Area Council's program includes sending volunteers into downtown Houston schools to teach scouting values to the children. In the Occoneechee Council, on the other hand, the Scoutreach program is predominantly focused on providing resources to existing units in underserved areas. They also give awards for scouts and adults who make significant contributions to the development of scouting in urban and rural communities. The Anthony Wayne Area Council primarily focuses on training and leadership development for units in urban and rural areas, and like the Occoneechee Council, offers awards for scouts and adults to contribute to developing scouting in these locations.

=== Financial assistance ===
Financial assistance, which is sometimes called "scholarships" or "camperships," is a Scoutreach-related program that aims to help youth from impoverished families attend camp. Much like other Scoutreach programs, applications for financial assistance vary significantly depending on the council. Scouts in the Cradle of Liberty Council have an April deadline to turn in their applications and must submit their family's income. The Michigan Crossroads Council uses the same April deadline for their applications, but they only offer to pay for 50% of the costs of camping. If a scout is a member of the Greater New York Councils, then their deadline is in February, and they must make a $65 deposit in order to apply. Meanwhile, the Sam Houston Area Council requests information on the social assistance status of the family in lieu of requesting specific income information.

=== Diversification of national staff ===
The vast majority of the Scouts BSA staff at the national level is male and white. As a result, the national organization has made it a goal in recent years to incorporate more people from minority communities in upper-level leadership positions. The strategies for doing this include recruiting college students, targeting specific minority communities for membership, and conducting research on the needs of an increasingly diverse scouting community.

== Legacy ==
There is limited research on the effects of ScoutReach. In one study dated to 2016, a team of researchers from Tufts University and the University of Washington at Tacoma sought to determine whether or not youths participating in Scoutreach ranked themselves higher on measures of character such a "kindness" and "helpfulness". The researchers found that participants ranked themselves highly in these measures in addition to expressing higher levels of racial and ethnic tolerance.

== See also ==
- Boy Scouts of America membership controversies

== Bibliography ==
- Dowdy, G. Wayne (2014-03-18). On This Day in Memphis History. Arcadia. ISBN 9781625845917.
- Petterchak, Janice A. (2003). Lone Scout: W. D. Boyce and American Boy Scouting. Rochester, Illinois: Legacy Press. ISBN 0-9653198-7-3.
- Wills, Chuck (2009). Boy Scouts of America : a centennial history. New York: DK Publishing. ISBN 978-0-7566-5634-8.
