= USS Cecil J. Doyle =

U.S. Navy WWII destroyer escort

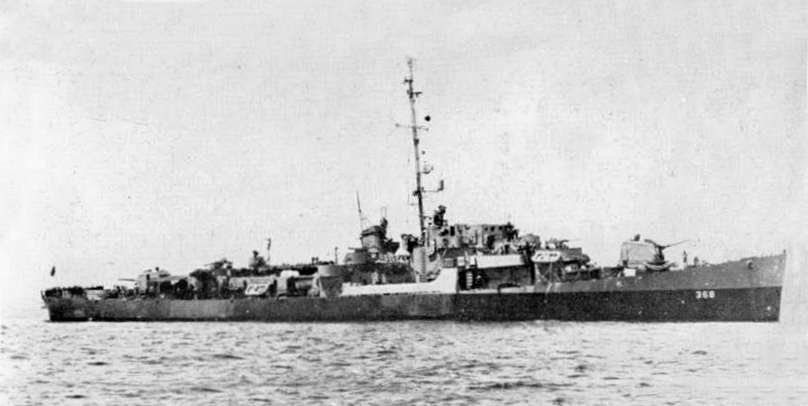
- USS Cecil J. Doyle c. 1945

History

United States
- Name: Cecil J. Doyle
- Namesake: Cecil J. Doyle
- Builder: Consolidated Steel Corporation, Orange, Texas
- Laid down: 12 May 1944
- Launched: 1 July 1944
- Commissioned: 16 October 1944
- Decommissioned: 2 July 1946
- Stricken: 1 July 1967
- Fate: Sunk as target, 2 December 1967

General characteristics
- Class & type: John C. Butler-class destroyer escort
- Displacement: 1,350 long tons (1,372 t)
- Length: 306 ft (93 m)
- Beam: 36 ft 8 in (11.18 m)
- Draft: 9 ft 5 in (2.87 m)
- Propulsion: 2 boilers, 2 geared turbine engines, 12,000 shp (8,900 kW); 2 propellers
- Speed: 24 kn (44 km/h)
- Range: 6,000 nmi (11,000 km) at 12 kn (22 km/h)
- Complement: 14 officers, 201 enlisted
- Armament: 2 × single 5 in (127 mm) guns; 2 × twin 40 mm (1.6 in) AA guns; 10 × single 20 mm (0.79 in) AA guns; 1 × triple 21 in (533 mm) torpedo tubes; 8 × depth charge throwers; 1 × Hedgehog ASW mortar; 2 × depth charge racks

USS Cecil J. Doyle (DE-368) was a John C. Butler-class destroyer escort in service with the United States Navy from 1944 to 1946. She was finally sunk as a target in 1967.

== History ==
She was named for United States Marine Corps aviator 2nd Lieutenant Cecil J. Doyle. Doyle was born August 10, 1920, in Marshall, Minnesota, a posthumous recipient of the Navy Cross for heroism during 18 to 25 October 1942 in the Solomon Islands campaign. The destroyer escort was launched on 1 July 1944 at Consolidated Steel Corporation, in Orange, Texas, sponsored by Mrs. O. P. Doyle. Cecil J. Doyle was commissioned on 16 October 1944.

Cecil J. Doyle carried out her first mission while still in shakedown, when she cruised on an air-sea rescue station during the flight of Government officials to the Yalta Conference. On 30 January 1945, she rendezvoused with HMS Ranee, and guarded the escort carrier through the Panama Canal and north to San Diego, California. Cecil J. Doyle continued on to Pearl Harbor and Eniwetok, where she arrived on 28 March to join the Marshalls-Gilbert Patrol and Escort Group. Her escort duties took her to Guam, and Ulithi, where on 30 April she was transferred to the Carolines Surface Patrol and Escort Group. On 2 May, Cecil J. Doyle's commanding officer became Commander, Screen, Peleliu, protecting the great anchorage in Kossol Roads.

While on patrol, Cecil J. Doyle several times rescued downed aviators, and on 27 May 1945, bombarded a bypassed Japanese garrison on Koror Island. On 2 August, she was ordered to the rescue of a large group of men in rafts reported at 11°30' N., 133°30' E., and bent on top speed to be the first ship to reach the survivors of the torpedoed cruiser Indianapolis. Her commanding officer, W. Graham Claytor Jr., approached at night and turned searchlights on the water and straight up on low clouds, lighting up the night and exposing his ship to possible attack by Japanese submarines. Captain Claytor ordered his Communications Officer Lieutenant James A. Fite, Jr. to inform the command that they were rescuing the crew of Indianapolis; this was the first definitive message of the fate of Indianapolis. She rescued 93 survivors, and gave final rites to 21 found already dead. Remaining in the area searching until 8 August, Cecil J. Doyle was the last to leave the scene. While only 316 men were rescued out of the crew of 1,196 aboard Indianapolis, Captain Claytor's actions were widely credited by survivors with preventing an even greater loss of life.

From 26 August 1945, when she sailed into Buckner Bay, Okinawa, the destroyer was assigned to occupation duty. She sailed with hospital ships to Wakayama, Japan, to evacuate released prisoners of war, then screened aircraft carriers providing air cover for the landing of occupation troops. Through 12 November, she cruised on courier duty between Japanese ports, and after drydocking at Yokosuka, sailed for San Francisco, California, arriving there on 13 January 1946.

She was decommissioned and placed in reserve at San Diego on 2 July 1946. On 2 December 1967, Cecil J. Doyle was sunk as a target during live-fire practice.
