= John H. Riley =

American politician

Commissioner of the Minnesota Department of Transportation
- In office 1991
- Governor: Arne Carlson
- Preceded by: Leonard Levine
- Succeeded by: James Denn

Administrator of the Federal Railroad Administration
- In office 1983–1989
- President: Ronald Reagan
- Preceded by: Robert W. Blanchette
- Succeeded by: Gilbert Carmichael

Personal details
- Born: January 19, 1947; New York City, New York, U.S.
- Died: March 6, 1994 (aged 47); Bryn Mawr, Pennsylvania, U.S.
- Education: Boston College (BA); Cornell University (JD)

John H. Riley (January 19, 1947 – March 6, 1994) was an American attorney and railroad transportation administrator.

== Early life and education ==
Riley was born in New York City and raised in Danbury, Connecticut. He earned a Bachelor of Arts degree from Boston College and a Juris Doctor from Cornell Law School.

== Career ==
After graduating from law school, Riley worked as an attorney in Minneapolis and Denver. He began his career in Washington, D.C. in 1978 as an aide to U.S. Senator David Durenberger (R-Minnesota) and was his chief counsel and later, his chief of staff. In 1982, Riley was nominated to serve as administrator of the Federal Railroad Administration (FRA). He served from 1983 to 1989 under Secretary of Transportation Elizabeth Dole. Riley is credited for recruiting W. Graham Claytor Jr. to come out of retirement and lead Amtrak for eleven years. Riley was a longtime Amtrak supporter and advocated for its funding during his years in Washington.

In 1990, Riley was named as Commissioner of the Minnesota Department of Transportation. He resigned in 1991 when he was diagnosed with an aggressive tumor in his brain. During a period of remission, Riley served on the executive committee of the Transportation Research Board.

== Personal life ==
Despite two major surgeries at Johns Hopkins University Medical Center in Baltimore, Maryland, and two periods of remission, he died of brain cancer in March 1994, and was buried in Ardmore, Pennsylvania.
