= Blue Ridge Mountains Council =

Scouting America local council

- Owner: Scouting America
- Headquarters: Hollins, Virginia
- Location: Roanoke, Virginia
- Country: United States
- Founded: 1972
- Website http://www.bsa-brmc.org

The Blue Ridge Mountains Council is a Scouting America council located in Roanoke, Virginia, that serves Scouts in southwest and south central Virginia. The Blue Ridge Mountains Council owns and operates the Blue Ridge Scout Reservation in Pulaski County, Virginia, the largest Council-owned Scout reservation in the United States. The council's Tutelo Lodge is part of the Order of the Arrow.

== History ==
The council was formed in 1972, following the merger of the former Piedmont and Blue Ridge councils into one consolidated council serving 21 counties. The Piedmont Council's headquarters had been in Lynchburg, Virginia, and after the merger the Blue Ridge Council's headquarters in Roanoke, Virginia, became the merged council's headquarters for its 13,562 members. The Associated Press reported that a key factor for the merger was the availability of the large Blue Ridge Scout Reservation and the Piedmont Council's sale of its old Camp Monocan for $190,000.

The Council developed the "Appomattox Court House Historic Trail" in 1972 at Appomattox Court House, Virginia, led by longtime volunteer Scouter, Dr. Charles Hansrote Jr., then-chairman of the Chemistry Department at Lynchburg College. A memorable highlight was the council's participation in the United States Bicentennial celebrations of 1976. In a Council-wide event, Scouts gathered to re-enact Gen. Nathanael Greene's retreat across the Dan River during the Revolutionary War. The Danville Register & Bee said the 3-day re-enactment was performed "with surprising detail" in depicting the Continental Army's successful crossing of the river in February, 1781, "to escape the Redcoats of Lord Charles Cornwallis".

In 2015, the council was required by the Virginia Department of Conservation and Recreation to rebuild a dam and spillway on a lake at its Camp Powhatan. Working with the Virginia Department of Game and Inland Fisheries, Pulaski County, Appalachian Power, and the Friends of Claytor Lake, the council had approximately 400 tons (400,000 kg) of concrete debris removed to nearby Claytor Lake for improved fish habitat at the 4,472-acre (1,810 ha) reservoir. Saying that Scouting is interested in sustainability, the Council Executive said that the expected increase in the lake's fish population of perch and bass will benefit fishermen, many of whom are former Scouts themselves. "Every Boy Scout and every Cub Scout learns how to fish", he said.

With declining membership intensified by the COVID-19 pandemic, the council was over $2 million in debt by 2021. This led to the sale of the Claytor Lake Aquatics Base for $2.7 million to real estate firm Shah Development in May 2024. As of January 2025 the Council is now debt free and growing again as part of the rebranded Scouting America.

== Organization ==
The council is part of Area 7 of the Southern Region of the BSA. The council has over 470 units sponsored by over 300 community organizations. BRMC is divided into six districts:

- Great Valley District
- Dan River District
- Mountain Empire District
- New River District
- Patrick Henry District
- Piedmont District

== Camps ==
=== "Old" Camp Powhatan ===
The Blue Ridge Council's original Camp Powhatan was located between Lexington, Virginia, and Roanoke near Natural Bridge and the Jefferson National Forest. In the 1920s–1930s, the council made the property available to Washington and Lee University for an unusual freshman orientation program. Held on a September weekend following the end of Scout summer camp, the popular 3-day camping program for incoming freshmen included sports such as baseball and swimming, along with university-led discussions about campus life and course selection, as a prelude to the regular on-campus student orientation.

=== Blue Ridge Scout Reservation ===
Blue Ridge Scout Reservation
- Location: Pulaski County, Virginia
- Founded: 1949
- Website http://www.brmcreservation.org

Blue Ridge Scout Reservation is located in Pulaski County, Virginia on a 16,000-acre (65 km^{2}) property, almost 7% of the total county area. The reservation also stretches into small parts of Montgomery, Floyd, and Carroll counties. The reservation features Camps Powhatan and Ottari, with a network of approximately 85 miles (137 km) of maintained mountainous trails crossing the land between the two base camps. It is the largest council-owned Scout Reservation in the United States and provides summer camping experiences to over 10,000 participants each summer.

==== The land's background ====
After the Civil War's Battle of Cloyd's Mountain near Radford, Virginia, the Union Army pushed farther south. One company stopped for the night on a tract of land on what is now the Blue Ridge Scout Reservation. One of the soldiers who worked for a Philadelphia iron works discovered that the rocks there contained a great deal of iron ore. After the war was over, the employee interested his firm, R.D. Wood and Sons, in the land. The company purchased the tract to establish iron mining there. By 1885, it was a thriving operation. By 1905, it was inactive. It was during this time that the Iron Furnace was built, which would later become the emblematic structure on the Reservation. When the last member of the original family, Walter Wood, died in 1934, he willed the land to Radford College, now Radford University "to be used to the best possible advantage." Radford College chose to sell the land in order to fund a concert organ for its music program. The Virginia General Assembly authorized the sale. The Blue Ridge Mountains Council (Roy Webb, a local of Pulaski, also put in bids for land, and got a little over 300 acres in the sale, including the Iron Furnace, a hiking trail that Mr Webb cut out was named after him, it runs off Dead Pine Mnt) put in the successful bid of $56,100 and acquired the 15,000-acre (61 km^{2}) tract, plus two farms with 216-acre (0.87 km^{2}) combined.

In 1949, the Blue Ridge Council established a camp on 400 acres (1.6 km^{2}) on Maxs Creek in Pulaski County. Buildings were constructed along Maxs Creek and an earthen dam was built to form a 7-acre (28,000 m^{2}) lake for swimming. The site was called "New" Camp Powhatan to distinguish it from the council's original camp, "Old" Camp Powhatan. The other base camp, Camp Ottari, was opened in the summer of 1962. After occupying a site leased by the Appalachian Power Company for over 10 years, the Claytor Lake Aquatics Base was established in the summer of 2008.

==== Camps Ottari and Powhatan ====
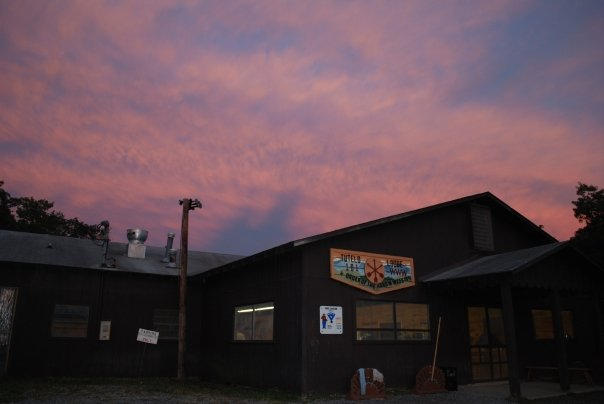
The Dining Hall at Camp Ottari

Camp Powhatan is positioned below the Jersey Ridge on the Blue Ridge Scout Reservation and offers Merit Badge instruction in Aquatics on Lake Powhatan, Scoutcraft, Handicraft, Eagles Nest, Shooting Sports, and Nature, along with a 60-foot (18 m) climbing tower. Camp Ottari is situated between Bench Mountain and North Ridge. The camp encompasses rugged, mountainous terrain, and a large lake. Merit badge instruction is offered in Nature, Handicraft, Scoutcraft, Aquatics, and Shooting Sports. Because of its larger lake, the camp offered Small Boat Sailing through the Ottari Marina. Camp Ottari provided Adult Leader Training in its training center, and features the Little Laurel Woodshop, where Scoutmasters could use traditional hand tools to create woodworking projects. Camp Ottari is no longer open for residential summer camp and is now used as the location for the Mountaineer program. Wood Badge training for adult leaders is conducted at the camp.

==== High Knoll Trail Adventure ====
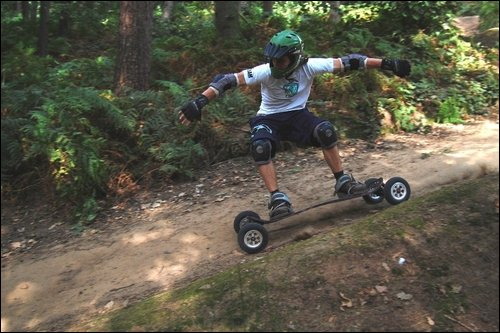
Mountainboarding is a popular feature on the High Knoll Trail

The High Knoll Trail Adventure is a backpacking program encompassing a network of over 100 miles (160 km) of mountainous trails that span the Blue Ridge Scout Reservation. Crews hike during the day, and make camp at one of a series of outposts in the evening. At the outposts, activities such as rock-climbing, blacksmithing, and rifle shooting are offered. Based out of Camp Ottari, the program attracts out-of-state participants and has been compared to a Philmont-like experience for Scouts. The Daily Advocate newspaper, in reporting on a group of Ohio Explorers traveling to the Virginia camp to participate in the High Knoll Trail program, described it as a "rugged outdoor adventure ... of back-packing and trail camping" on the six-day trek. In 2000, visiting Boy Scouts from Pennsylvania set a record for the trail at the time, hiking 68 miles (100 km) in five days. Backpackers must be at least 13 years old and at least 1st Class rank by June 1st to participate in High Knoll.

- Huff Farm — offers experience on a working horse ranch. Scouts learn skills in roping and horsemanship. A trail ride is offered, and a Chili dinner is served in the evening.
- Rendezvous — Participants learn to use a black-powder rifle, throw tomahawks and knives, and develop skills that enabled settlers to survive the frontier of the Blue Ridge Mountains.
- Wild Goose — Participants learn basic skills and gain experience in Mountainboarding.
- Point Camp — offers bouldering, rock climbing, and rappelling on a natural rock face.

==== New River Adventure ====
The New River Adventure is a high adventure program for older Scouts, based at Camp Powhatan. The program includes the BSA's COPE ("Challenging Outdoor Personal Experience") activities, such as ropes courses, natural rock climbing, spelunking in the area's limestone caves, and mountaineering. During the week, participants take a 3-day whitewater rafting trip on the Class I-V rapids of the New River Gorge National River.

==== Canoe the New ====
Canoe the New, previously known as Voyageur Trek, is a canoeing program, in which participants embark on a five-day, 50-mile (80 km) canoe trip on the Roanoke River. Throughout the program, Scouts learn about the French Canadian Voyageurs that forged the first paths in the New World. During the trek, Scouts hone paddling skills, learn to read whitewater, fish the waters of the New River, and go whitewater rafting in the New River Gorge. Canoe the New is a provisional program, and Scouts must be 13 years old and pass the BSA Swim Test to participate.

==== Fish Camp ====
Fish Camp was a provisional program based out of Camp Powhatan which instructed Scouts in the skills of fishing and fly-fishing. Throughout the week, area anglers instructed Scouts about the environment and biology that influences fish behavior. Participants fished in the lakes and rivers on, and surrounding, the Blue Ridge Scout Reservation. This program was renowned for its float trip on the New River, and fly-fishing trip beneath the waterfalls of the Cascades. When Fish Camp was offered it was a provisional program, offering leadership for Scouts aged 13 years and older.

==== Mountaineer ====
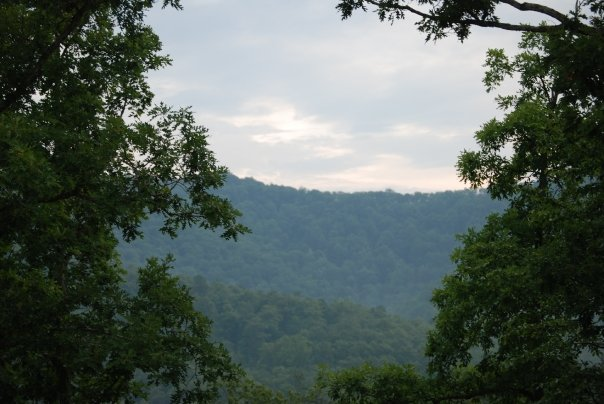
The Blue Ridge Scout Reservation encompasses 17,500 acres of mountainous terrain

Mountaineer is a provisional program located at Camp Ottari on the Blue Ridge Scout Reservation. Daniel Boone's Wilderness Road is located several miles from the encampment. Participants experience Appalachian Virginia by learning the skills of the 18th century woodsmen that settled in the area. Scouts dress in period clothing and participate in shooting muzzle-loading black-powder rifles, building fires using flint and steel, blacksmithing, leather working, throwing tomahawks and knives, cooking, and wilderness survival. Scouts from as far away as Florida have participated.

==== Brownsea Island ====
The Brownsea Island Adventure is a summer camp program designed to help younger Scouts learn the patrol method, and develop basic Scout skills. It is offered at camp Powhatan and used to be offered at Ottari. Scouts are divided into groups of 8-10 boys, and paired with a staff member who serves as their guide. Participants learn the essential skills of Scouting, and complete many of the requirements for Scout through First Class through interactive lessons, daily competitions, and a hike.

==== Claytor Lake Aquatics Base ====
The Claytor Lake Aquatics Base was a 75-acre aquatics base, opened in the summer of 2008, situated on the 4,500-acre (18 km^{2}) Claytor Lake. Programs offered to attending Scouts (aged 13 and older) included motor boating, large boat sailing, small boat sailing, water skiing, kayaking, snorkeling, scuba diving, rowing, and wakeboarding. The base was sold off in its entirety in 2024 to resolve council debts. These programs are still offered under the name of Claytor Lake Adventure or Claytor Lake Aquatics Program. Scouts stay at Camp Powhatan and head to the lake daily for activities.

=== Camp Tye Brook and Camp Bolton Smith ===
The Piedmont Council once ran two camps near Lynchburg, Camp Tye Brook and Camp Bolton Smith. Both closed in 1940 due to water contamination. Camp Bolton Smith was named after Bolton Smith, who had worked to promote expanding Scouting in the African American community.

== Program and activities ==
Foxfire is the name of the National Youth Leadership Training course offered by the council. The NYLT course develops Scouts into trained troop leaders, by focusing on the concepts of what a leader must be, what he must know, and what he must do. Scouts are divided into patrols and participate in the Quest for the Meaning of Leadership. Participants experience presentations, activities and patrol competitions. Foxfire is a provisional program where participants must be 13 years old and First Class by the beginning of the Program to participate.

== Order of the Arrow ==
Tutelo Lodge
- Website http://www.tutelo161.org

The council's Order of the Arrow program is represented by Tutelo Lodge 161. The name reflects the small Tutelo Indian tribe that once inhabited the area. On its website, the Lodge traces its origin to the merger on January 1, 1973, of the former Blue Ridge Council's Powhatan Lodge 456 and Koo Koo Ku Hoo Lodge 161 of the old Piedmont Council, combined after the two Councils merged. Koo Koo Ku Hoo Lodge's predecessor is said to have begun in 1939 as Ne-Pah-Win Lodge 161, at a camp in Nelson County.

== See also ==
- Scouting in Virginia
