= W. Graham Claytor Jr. =

American government official (1912–1994)

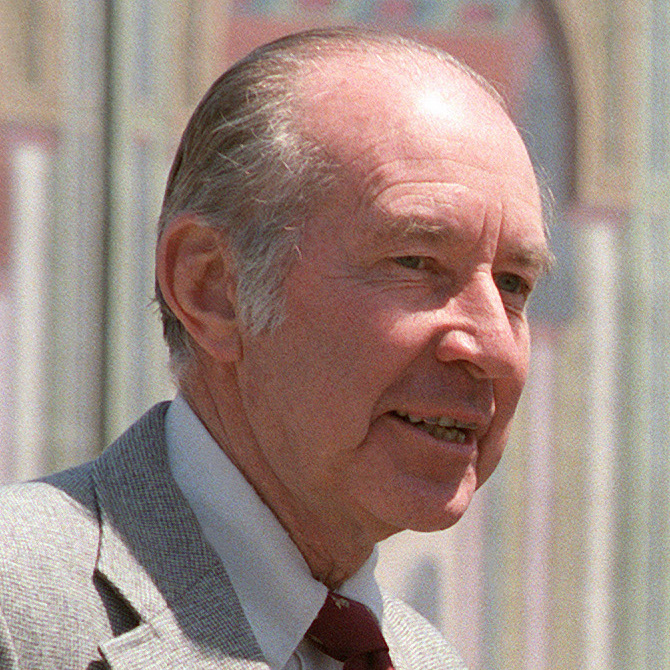
- Claytor in 1984

President and CEO of Amtrak
- In office 1982–1993
- Preceded by: Alan S. Boyd
- Succeeded by: Thomas Downs

18th United States Deputy Secretary of Defense
- In office August 21, 1979 – January 16, 1981
- President: Jimmy Carter
- Preceded by: Charles Duncan Jr.
- Succeeded by: Frank Carlucci

63rd United States Secretary of the Navy
- In office February 14, 1977 – August 24, 1979
- President: Jimmy Carter
- Preceded by: J. William Middendorf
- Succeeded by: Edward Hidalgo

Personal details
- Born: William Graham Claytor Jr. March 14, 1912 Roanoke, Virginia, U.S.
- Died: May 14, 1994 (aged 82) Bradenton, Florida, U.S.
- Party: Democratic
- Spouse: Frances Claytor
- Education: University of Virginia (BA); Harvard University (LLB)

Military service
- Allegiance: United States
- Branch/service: United States Navy
- Years of service: 1941–1946
- Rank: Lieutenant Commander
- Battles/wars: World War II

William Graham Claytor Jr. (March 14, 1912 – May 14, 1994) was an American attorney, United States Navy officer, railroad executive, and administrator of railroad, transportation, and defense affairs for the United States government, working under the administrations of three US presidents.

He is remembered for his actions as the commanding officer of the destroyer escort USS Cecil J. Doyle during World War II, which helped to save 316 lives during the USS Indianapolis tragedy. Over 30 years later, Claytor's moderate actions on behalf of the rights of female and gay service personnel as Secretary of the Navy were considered progressive for the time. His transportation career included ten years as president of the Southern Railway and 11 years as the head of Amtrak, guiding the passenger railroad through a particularly difficult period. He was named the Virginian of the Year in 1977.

== Early life and career ==
Claytor was born in Roanoke, Virginia, on March 14, 1912, and grew up in both Virginia and Philadelphia. He was the son of Gertrude Harris Boatwright Claytor, a lyric poet, and William Graham Claytor (1886–1971), who was vice-president of Appalachian Power.

Claytor graduated from the University of Virginia in Charlottesville, Virginia in 1933. He graduated from Harvard Law School summa cum laude in 1936. He clerked for Learned Hand, Judge of the U.S. Court of Appeals for the Second Circuit, then moved to Washington, D.C., to become law clerk to U.S. Supreme Court Associate Justice Louis Brandeis. After his clerkships, he joined the prestigious Washington law firm Covington and Burling.

== Career ==
=== World War II — USS Indianapolis tragedy ===
In 1940, soon after the start of World War II, 28-year-old Claytor attempted to enlist, but was initially rejected by the United States Navy as being too old. He finally joined under a special provision, based upon his previous experience in sports boating, and was assigned to the Pacific Theater.

Late in the war, Claytor became commanding officer of the destroyer escort USS Cecil J. Doyle on patrol in the Pacific Ocean. In August 1945, Claytor sped without orders to investigate reports of men floating in the water. As Cecil J. Doyle approached the area at night, Claytor turned the ship's searchlights on the water and straight up on low clouds, lighting up the night, despite the risk of exposing his ship to possible attack by Japanese submarines. These actions facilitated the rescue of the survivors of the sunken cruiser USS Indianapolis, which was torpedoed by the Imperial Japanese Navy submarine I-58.

Indianapolis had been on a secret mission and, due to a communications error, had not been reported as overdue (or missing). An estimated 900 men survived the sinking, but spent days floating in life jackets trying to fight off sharks. While only 316 were rescued out of a crew of 1199 who were aboard Indianapolis, Claytor's actions were widely credited by survivors with preventing an even greater loss of life.

=== Legal practice and Southern Railway ===
After World War II, Claytor resumed practicing law in Washington, D.C. He became an officer of the Southern Railway in 1963, and served as president from 1967 to 1977. Notwithstanding his legal background, Claytor was known as an "operations" man, often riding the company's trains, monitoring and questioning performance. In contrast to his predecessor, D. William Brosnan, Claytor was an "employee's President," often chatting with the crews of the trains on which he rode, actively soliciting their suggestions on how to make the railroad run better. He carried this attitude with him during his later service as the president of Amtrak.

=== U.S. government service ===
Claytor served as the Secretary of the Navy under President Jimmy Carter from 1977 to 1979. He is credited with leading the United States Navy into its first recognition of women's right to serve on ships and of rights of gays to leave the service without criminal records. His positions were considered by activists to be progressive for the time, leading to further progress years later in these controversial issues.

In 1979, he was appointed to the position of Deputy Secretary of Defense. General Colin Powell served as his military assistant.

In the summer of 1979, he took a brief leave from the Defense Department to serve as Acting Secretary of Transportation in President Carter's Cabinet. His service at the Transportation Department bridged the tenures of Secretary Brock Adams and Secretary Neil Goldschmidt.

=== Amtrak ===
In 1982, Claytor came out of retirement to lead Amtrak. He was recruited and strongly supported by John H. Riley, an attorney who was also the head of the Federal Railroad Administration (FRA) under the Reagan Administration from 1983 to 1989.

Claytor maintained a good relationship with the U.S. Congress during his 11 years in the position. Within 7 years of being under Claytor's leadership, Amtrak was generating enough money to cover 72 percent of its $1.7 billion operating budget by 1989, up from 48 percent in 1981. This was achieved mainly through vigorous cost-cutting and aggressive marketing. He is credited with bringing political and operational stability to the nation's passenger train network, keeping the railroad functioning properly despite repeated attempts by the administrations of Ronald Reagan and his successor George H. W. Bush to eliminate its funding.

Claytor retired from Amtrak in 1993.

== Legacy and heritage ==
Claytor was named the Virginian of the Year in 1977. In 1989, he was named Railroader of the Year by Railway Age magazine.

He was the brother of Robert B. Claytor, who became president of Norfolk and Western Railway in 1981 and was the first chairman and CEO of Norfolk Southern after it was formed by merger with the Southern Railway System in 1982. Robert B. Claytor is best remembered by many railfans for reactivating Norfolk and Western Railway's steam program, which rebuilt steam locomotives Class J 611 and Class A 1218 at the Steam Restoration Shop at Norris Yard in Irondale, AL, and operated excursion trips. Claytor Jr. would occasionally take the throttle as engineer with his brother on the steam excursions.

Claytor died on May 14, 1994.

At Amtrak's Washington, DC Union Station a passenger concourse was renamed "Claytor Concourse" in his honor.

"The Claytor Brothers: Virginians Building America's Railroad" is a semi-permanent exhibit at the Virginia Museum of Transportation in Roanoke, Virginia.

== See also ==
- List of law clerks for the fourth seat of the Supreme Court of the United States
- List of railroad executives

Business positions
Preceded by D. William Brosnan	President of Southern Railway; 1967–1977	Succeeded by L. Stanley Crane
Preceded by Alan S. Boyd	President of Amtrak; 1982–1993	Succeeded by Thomas Downs
Government offices
Preceded by J. William Middendorf	United States Secretary of the Navy; February 14, 1977 – August 24, 1979	Succeeded by Edward Hidalgo
Political offices
Preceded by Charles Duncan Jr.	United States Deputy Secretary of Defense; 1979–1981	Succeeded by Frank Carlucci
Awards
Preceded by Darius W. Gaskins Jr. (BN)	Modern Railways magazine's Man of the Year; 1989	Succeeded by Arnold B. McKinnon (NS)
