= Gertrude Harris Boatwright Claytor =

American poet

Gertrude Harris Boatwright Claytor (October 1, 1888 – August 21, 1973) was an American poet.

== Biography ==
Born in Staunton, Virginia, she later moved with her family to Roanoke, Virginia, where she was privately educated. In 1908 she married William Graham Claytor (1886–1971), an engineer at the Roanoke Railway and Electric Company (later known as Appalachian Electric Power Company). Their five sons included William Graham Claytor Jr. (1912–1994), who was secretary of the navy from 1977 to 1979, deputy secretary of defense, acting secretary of transportation, and president of Southern Railway and of Amtrak, and Robert Buckner Claytor, president of the Norfolk and Western Railway Company and chief executive officer of the Norfolk Southern Corporation.

Late in the 1920s, Claytor began publishing poetry in such periodicals as the Carolina Quarterly, Florida Magazine of Verse, Georgia Review, The New York Times, Prairie Schooner, and Saturday Review of Literature. She also published two collections, Sunday in Virginia and Other Poems (1951) and Mirage at Midnight and Other Poems (1960). She won the annual "Poetry Society of America" prize in 1932.

A close friend of Edgar Lee Masters, author of Spoon River Anthology (1915), Claytor presented her collection of signed first editions, letters, manuscript poems, and other materials that Masters had given her to Princeton University, and the material is held in the Princeton University Library's Special Collection The Gertrude Claytor Collection also includes photographs of both Claytor and Masters.

== Sources ==
- John T. Kneebone et al., eds., Dictionary of Virginia Biography (Richmond: The Library of Virginia, 1998- ), 3:291-292. ISBN 0-88490-206-4
