= W. Graham Claytor =

William Graham Claytor (December 20, 1886 – February 28, 1971), of Roanoke, Virginia, was an American engineer and the vice president of Appalachian Power Company, an electric utility service.

He is best remembered for supervising the construction of the Claytor Dam and creation of a 4,500 acre (18 km^{2}), 21 mile (34 km) long lake on the New River in Pulaski County, a hydroelectric project completed in 1939. The resultant Claytor Lake and surrounding Claytor Lake State Park in Virginia are named for him.

Claytor married Gertrude Harris Boatwright, a lyric poet who published two collections of her poems. Two of their three sons became well-known transportation administrators who led several large American railroads:

- W. Graham Claytor Jr. (1912–1994) headed the Southern Railway and later Amtrak.
- Robert B. Claytor (1922–1993) was president of the Norfolk and Western Railway, and the first president of the new Norfolk Southern when it was created in 1982.

"The Claytor Brothers: Virginians Building America's Railroad" is a semi-permanent exhibit at the Virginia Museum of Transportation in Roanoke, Virginia.
