= Miller–Claytor House =

Historic house in Virginia, United States

- U.S. National Register of Historic Places
- Virginia Landmarks Register
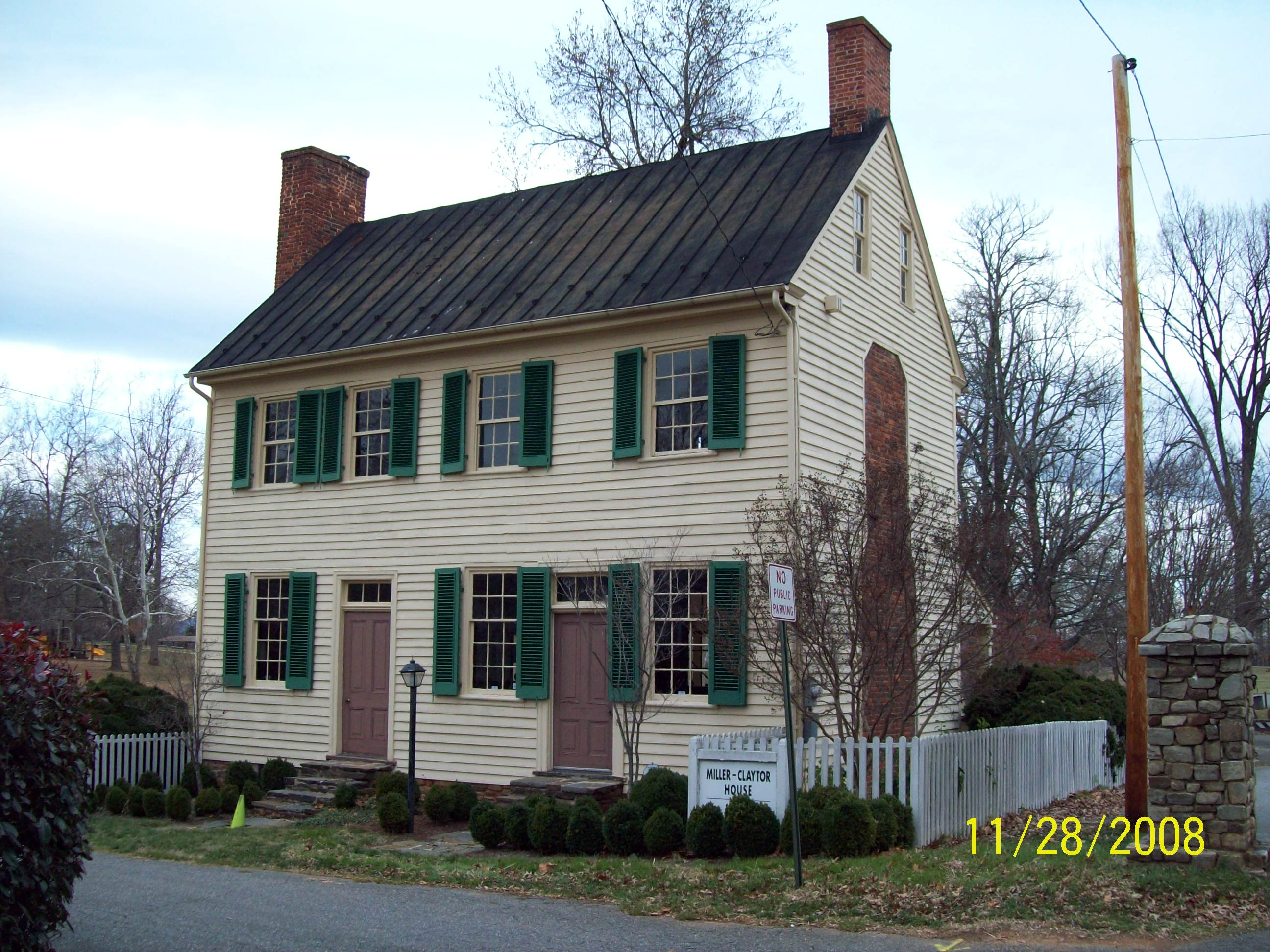
- Miller–Claytor House (Front View), Lynchburg VA, November 2008

- Location within Virginia Location within the United States
- Location: Treasure Island Rd. at Miller-Claytor Lane, Lynchburg, Virginia
- Coordinates: 37°26′12″N 79°9′49″W
- Area: less than one acre
- Built: 1791
- NRHP reference No.: 76002223
- VLR No.: 118-0012

Significant dates
- Added to NRHP: May 6, 1976
- Designated VLR: October 21, 1975

Miller–Claytor House is a historic home located at Riverside Park in Lynchburg, Virginia. It is a two-story, white framed structure, sheathed with beaded weatherboards. It is believed to be the fourth house erected in the new town in 1791, and is probably the oldest extant Lynchburg dwelling. In 1936, the imminent demolition of the house led to the formation of the Lynchburg Historical Society and the subsequent removal of the house to its present site.

It was listed on the National Register of Historic Places in 1976.

== Gallery ==
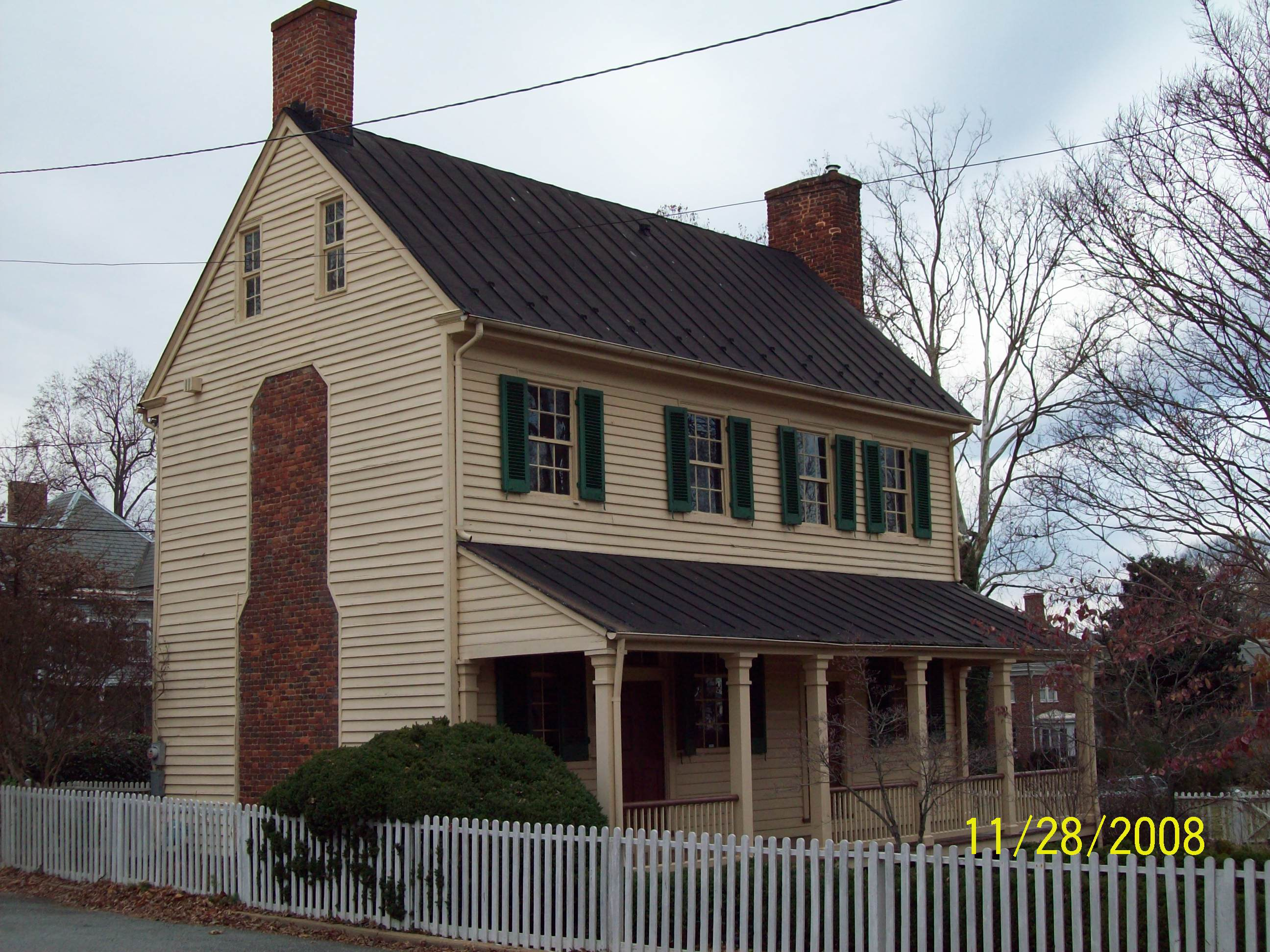
Miller–Claytor House (rear view), Lynchburg, Virginia, November 2008
