= Dunkard Bottom, West Virginia =

Dunkard Bottom
- Historic West Virginia community
- Etymology: German: Tunker "one who immerses"
- Location of Dunkard Bottom in West Virginia, USA. Dunkard Bottom (the United States)
- Coordinates: 39°27′59″N 79°38′59″W
- Founded: 1753
- Destroyed: 1757

Population
  - Estimate (1757): 31

Dunkard Bottom (sometimes written Dunkard's Bottom, Dunkert Bottom, or Dunker Bottom) was a Schwarzenau Brethren religious community established on the Cheat River in 1753 by brothers Samuel, Gabriel and Israel Eckerlin. It flourished for only a few years until it was destroyed by Native Americans in 1757.

== Establishment, 1753 ==
=== Origins in Pennsylvania ===
Samuel, Gabriel and Israel Eckerlin were members of the German Baptist Brethren community in Ephrata, Pennsylvania, who, in the mid-1740s, had a conflict with the community's founder, Conrad Beissel. The Eckerlins had immigrated to Pennsylvania along with other Anabaptists from the Schwarzenau, Wittgenstein community of modern-day Bad Berleburg, North Rhine-Westphalia, in what was then the Holy Roman Empire. Israel Eckerlin heard Beissel speak and was baptized in 1728. He and his brothers moved to the Ephrata Cloister in 1729. By the early 1740s, the Eckerlins had become community leaders and decided to make the community self-sufficient by planting an orchard, building a mill and starting a workshop for the manufacture of cloth. In 1742 Samuel purchased a printing press and printed a number of books, including John Bunyan's Pilgrim's Progress, as well as several other works in German. Israel, who had been appointed prior of the cloister, wanted to construct a bell tower. Beissel felt that he was being marginalized as a leader and objected to these innovations. In September 1745, following an angry confrontation, the Eckerlins and their colleague Alexander Mack Jr. (son of Alexander Mack, first minister of the Schwarzenau Brethren) left the community to establish their own settlement, Mahanaim, at Dunkard's Bottom, Virginia.

=== Mahanaim ===
The settlement grew as other settlers arrived from Ephrata in 1748, however within a few years residents started returning to Pennsylvania, discouraged by the harsh winters, isolation and growing tension with Native Americans in the area, who would steal corn from their fields at harvest time, leaving them with little food for the winter. Gabriel hunted to provide meat, however the Brethren were vegetarians and felt that hunting was contrary to their beliefs. In February 1750, Israel and Gabriel returned to Ephrata but were unable to persuade any new settlers to return with them to Virginia. In May 1751, Israel traveled to Logstown to meet with George Croghan, and requested leave of the Iroquois Confederacy to settle on the Youghiogheny River. He was told that he would need the permission of the Onondaga Council. The Eckerlin brothers decided to speak with Christopher Gist who was Land Agent for the Ohio Company of Virginia, and they were permitted to settle on a tract of land along the Monongahela River.

=== Dunkard Creek ===
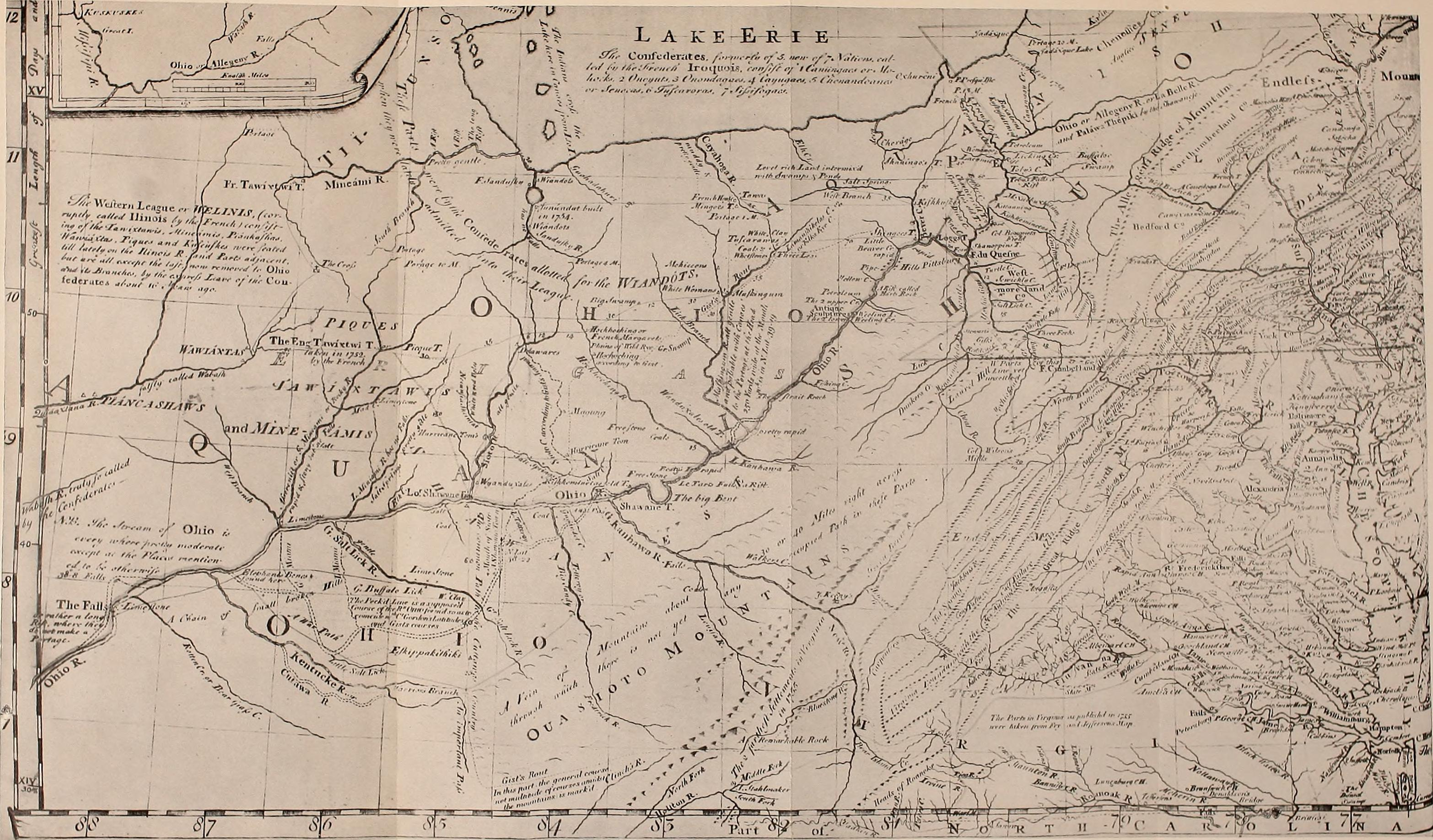
1755 map showing "Dunkers Cr." just to the right of map's center.

In April 1753 Samuel Eckerlin hired two surveyors, Thomas Lewis and his brother Andrew Lewis, to survey land in what is now Monongalia County, West Virginia. The Lewises documented the work: "Survey'd for Samuel Eckerlin 360 acres of land...Lying on ye East Side of Monongalo River Between the mouth of Indian Creek & Eckerlin's Creek. This 20th Ap. 1753. By Andr Lewis asst s., Thos Lewis sur." However, Delaware Indians warned the Eckerlins that it would be risky for them to settle in this area, known today as Dunkard Creek, and that the Delawares might not be able to protect them, so the Eckerlins selected a site further south.

=== Relocation to the Cheat River, 1753 ===
In 1753 Samuel Eckerlin sold his land on the New River in Virginia to Gerhard (Garrett) Zinn and William Davis. Soon the Eckerlin brothers had reestablished themselves in a new community, referred to as Dunkard Bottom, on the Cheat River in what was at the time, the Colony of Virginia, and is now Preston County, West Virginia. They were granted a patent for 5000 acres by Governor Robert Dinwiddie and the Ohio Company in November 1753. The new community began breeding horses and some sources say that they had planned to mine gold and silver.

The community was visited in June 1756 by Samuel Eckerlin's friend Ezechiel Sangmeister, who was unhappy with life at the Ephrata Cloister and wanted to live on the frontier. Sangmeister noted that the Eckerlins "talked much about buying all the land between their dwelling, where they presently were, and Patterson Creek, a two-day's [sic] journey away, and settle pious people upon it so that they would always lodge with pious people who were on their land while traveling to and fro." Sangmeister described the Eckerlins as living primarily by hunting and selling furs, meat and tallow to other settlers:

"Israel was busy day and night with his mystic speculations, while Gabriel was engaged in murdering animals all day, and Samuel was kept busy preparing and curing the peltries. Piles of bearskins served as their couch at night, while in one corner of the cabin was a mass of skins which could not have been bought for a hundred pounds sterling. Then back of the chimney hung so many sides of dead bears that it made him shudder merely to look at them. Their chief assistant was a redemption servant, one Johann Schilling...The brothers at that time had no less than twenty-eight horses."

The Eckerlins also tapped maple trees to make maple sugar, sending syrup and sugar to the settlements.

== Dunkard Bottom massacre, 1757 ==
Suspected of sympathy with the French, Samuel Eckerlin was detained in 1757 while on a supply trip to Fort Pleasant, near present Moorefield, West Virginia. He was brought to Williamsburg by Dr. Thomas Walker, who protested that Eckerlin had no connection with the French and convinced Governor Dinwiddie to release him. Samuel returned to the Dunkard settlement accompanied by Captain Robert MacKenzie and some soldiers, supposedly sent with him to investigate the truth of his story. However, the governor had secretly ordered the arrest of the other Brethren living at Dunkard Bottom, writing to George Washington on 24 October 1757:

"The Duncard’s Petition was heard before me & the Council, & Yr Letter in regard thereto, & as the People on the Frontiers are uneasy with them, believing them to be Spies, it was resolv’d that You send a Party out to bring in the other two Brothers, with their Cattle & Horses & any Thing they have that they conveniently can bring with them, & to remain among the Inhabitants during the present War."

On arriving at Dunkard Bottom, they discovered that Ottawa warriors sympathetic to the French had attacked the settlement, killing 28 settlers and taking Israel and Gabriel Eckerlin prisoner, together with their servant Johann Schilling. They found "everything ravaged, devastated, and burned by the savages, which from all outward signs and appearances happened around harvest time in the year 1757." An article in The Pennsylvania Gazette on 5 January 1758, quoted from a letter dated 27 December 1757: "Captain M’Kenzie, who was sent out for the Dunkers, told me Yesterday, he found nothing on the Spot they inhabited but some Spears, broken Tomahawks, and the Ashes of their Hutts. The Spears were of French Make. (These Dunkers, as they live unmolested by the French, were supposed to be in their Interest.)" The soldiers took the destruction as belated evidence that the Eckerlins were innocent.

== Aftermath ==
Israel's indentured servant, Johann Shilling, also captured by the Ottawa, escaped in 1759 and reported on the fate of the Eckerlin brothers. Israel and Gabriel were taken by the Ottawa warriors to Fort Duquesne where they were sold to the French and transported to Quebec. There they were treated kindly and stayed at the Jesuit College in Quebec City before being sent to La Rochelle, France, where they converted to Roman Catholicism. Israel died soon afterwards, and Gabriel became a monk known as "Le Bon Chretien." He died in a French monastery.

Samuel Eckerlin resettled at Strasburg, Virginia, became a physician, and established a medical facility there. In 1764 he returned to Ephrata, seeking to claim his rights to the land the cloister was built on, and for which the original 1739 deed still existed. The Pennsylvania Supreme Court recognized him as the rightful owner of Ephrata. In 1770 he sold the land back to the Brethren for only five shillings.

== Later years ==
About 1768, the abandoned Eckerlin settlement was occupied by George Morris (1745-1842), who had a farm near Garards Fort, Pennsylvania. He built a hunting cabin there and was able to persuade a number of families to relocate to Dunkard Bottom. Kingwood was established nearby in 1811 and Camp Dawson was established in 1909.

== Memorialization ==
A historical marker was placed near Albright, West Virginia in 2012 by the West Virginia Department of Culture and History. It states: "Thomas Echarlin (Echarly) and two brothers settled here, 1784; first white men of record in Preston County. Brothers killed by Indians and cabin was burned."
