= Claytor Dam =

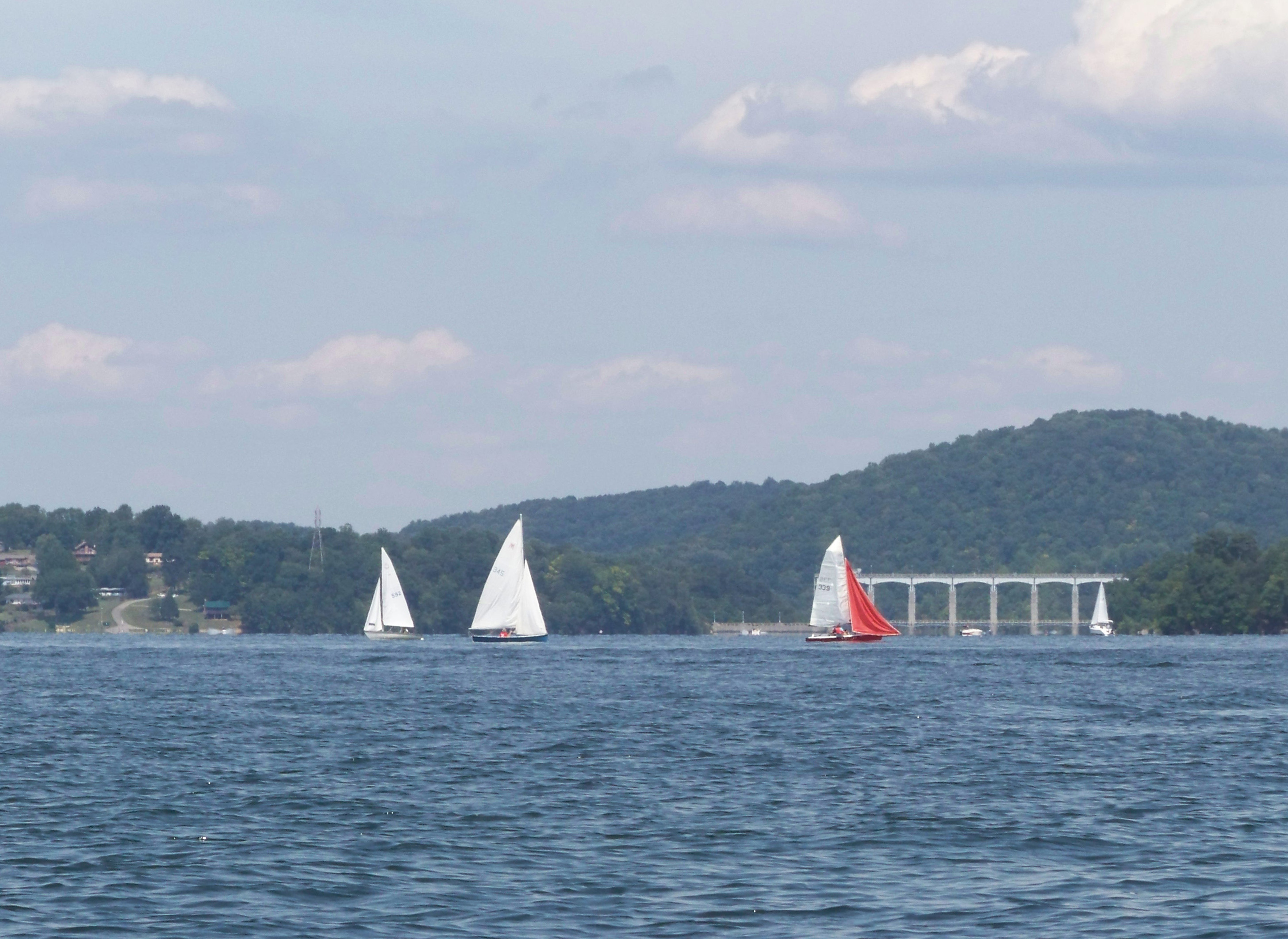
- Claytor Lake just above the dam

- Location within Virginia
- Country: United States
- Location: Pulaski County, Virginia
- Coordinates: 37°4′31.23″N 80°35′5.53″W
- Purpose: Power
- Status: Operational
- Opening date: 1939; 87 years ago

Dam and spillways
- Type of dam: Gravity
- Impounds: New River
- Height: 145 ft (44 m)
- Length: 1,142 ft (348 m)
- Spillways: 9 sluice gates
- Spillway type: Controlled, crest overflow

Reservoir
- Creates: Claytor Lake
- Total capacity: 225,000 acre⋅ft (278,000,000 m^{3})
- Surface area: 4,472 acres (1,810 ha)
- Maximum length: 21.67 mi (34.87 km)
- Maximum water depth: 115 ft (35 m)
- Normal elevation: 1,846 ft (563 m)

Power Station
- Commission date: 1939
- Turbines: 4 x 18.75 MW Francis-type
- Installed capacity: 75 MW

The Claytor Dam is a gravity dam on the New River in Pulaski County, Virginia, United States. It is located about 2.5 mi (4.0 km) south of Radford. It is named after William Graham Claytor, then vice president of Appalachian Power Company (APC), who was instrumental in the dam's construction. APC is now a subsidiary of American Electric Power (AEP), which owns the dam. The primary purpose of the dam is hydroelectric power generation, and it supports a 75 MW power station. Its reservoir, Claytor Lake, is also used for recreation. The dam was constructed and its power station commissioned in 1939. It received its first license in 1943. It is 1,142 ft (348 m) long and 145 ft (44 m) tall. It stores a reservoir with a capacity of 225,000 acre⋅ft (278,000,000 m^{3}). The reservoir covers 4,472 acres (1,810 ha) and stretches 21.67 mi (34.87 km) behind the dam.

== See also ==
- Claytor Lake
- Claytor Lake State Park
