= Claytor Lake =

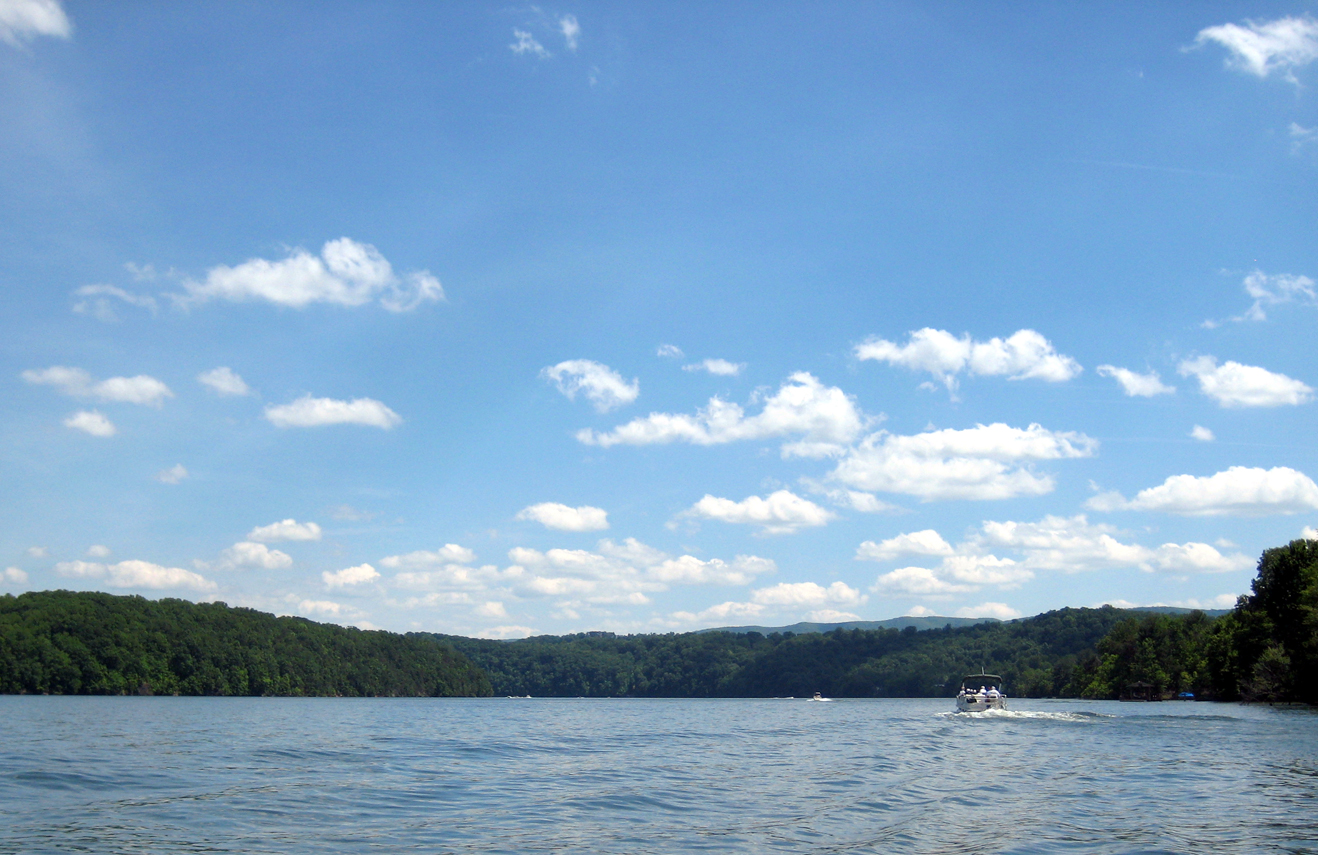

- Location within Virginia Location within the United States
- Location: Pulaski County, Virginia, United States
- Coordinates: 37°04′30″N 80°35′05″W
- Lake type: reservoir
- Primary inflows: New River
- Primary outflows: New River
- Basin countries: United States
- Max. length: 21.67 mi (34.87 km)
- Surface area: 4,472 acres (1,810 ha)
- Surface elevation: 1,846 ft (563 m) (normal full pool)

Claytor Lake in Pulaski County, Virginia, is a 4,472-acre (1,810 ha), 21-mile-long (34 km) reservoir on the New River, created for an Appalachian Power Company (APC) hydroelectric project. It is named for William Graham Claytor, Sr. (1886–1971) of Roanoke, Virginia, a vice president of APC who had supervised the construction of the Claytor Dam, which created the lake.

Three miles of Claytor Lake's shoreline is bordered by Virginia's Claytor Lake State Park.

== History ==
In 1910, the New River Power Company began acquiring land on the New River south of Radford, Virginia for the impoundment for several hydroelectric dam projects. By 1925, these projects had been combined, and control of the project passed to APC. The construction of Development No. 6, later called the Claytor Dam, began in 1937 and was completed in 1939. By the Spring of 1940, the New River was fully impounded, and Claytor Lake was formed.

Claytor Dam is a concrete gravity dam, impounding an estimated storage capacity of 225,000 acre-feet. The plant is the largest of the power company's 12 hydroelectric plants, with a total generating capacity of 75 megawatts.

In early 1944, the people of the surrounding area expressed an interest in the establishment of a state park on the new lake. The idea continued to grow, and in 1946 private citizens and businesses from Pulaski, Radford and Blacksburg raised the money needed to purchase 437 acres (1.77 km^{2}) from APC. This land was given to the state to be developed as Claytor Lake State Park.

== Friends of Claytor Lake ==
Friends of Claytor Lake is a non-profit organization that is dedicated to the environmental conservation of Claytor Lake. They operate a clean-up crew to remove debris from Claytor Lake, averaging 6,000 tons of debris and trash each year. They also support programs in boater safety, water quality, hydrilla control, and other areas related to recreation and the environment.

In 2015, the Friends worked with the Boy Scouts' Blue Ridge Mountains Council to obtain approximately 400 tons (400,000 kg) of concrete debris for improved fish habitat at Claytor Lake. The debris was from a demolished spillway at the council's nearby Camp Powhatan. Also involved in the project were the Virginia Department of Game and Inland Fisheries, Pulaski County, and APC.

== New River Trail ==
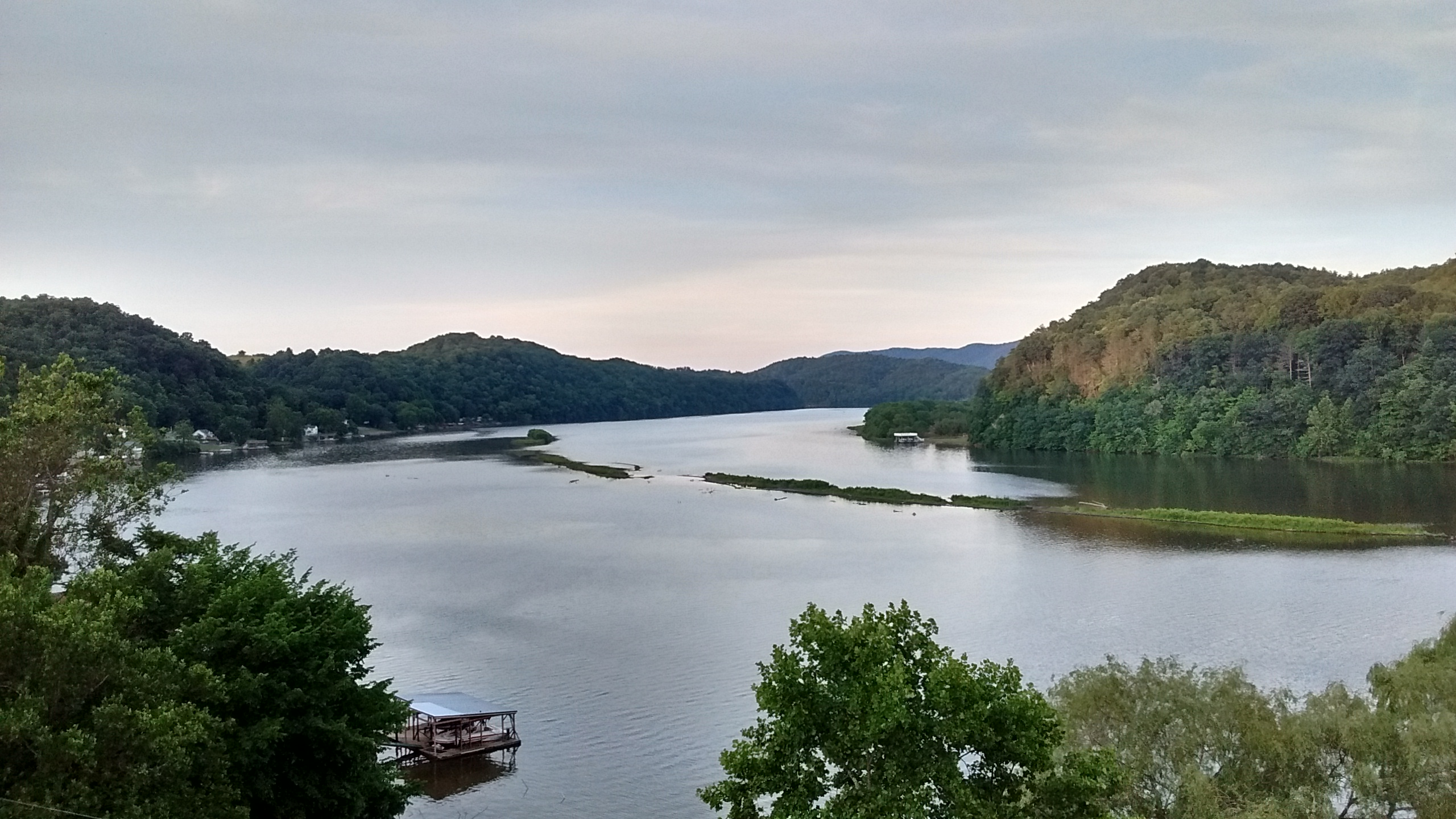
View of Claytor Lake from the New River Trail

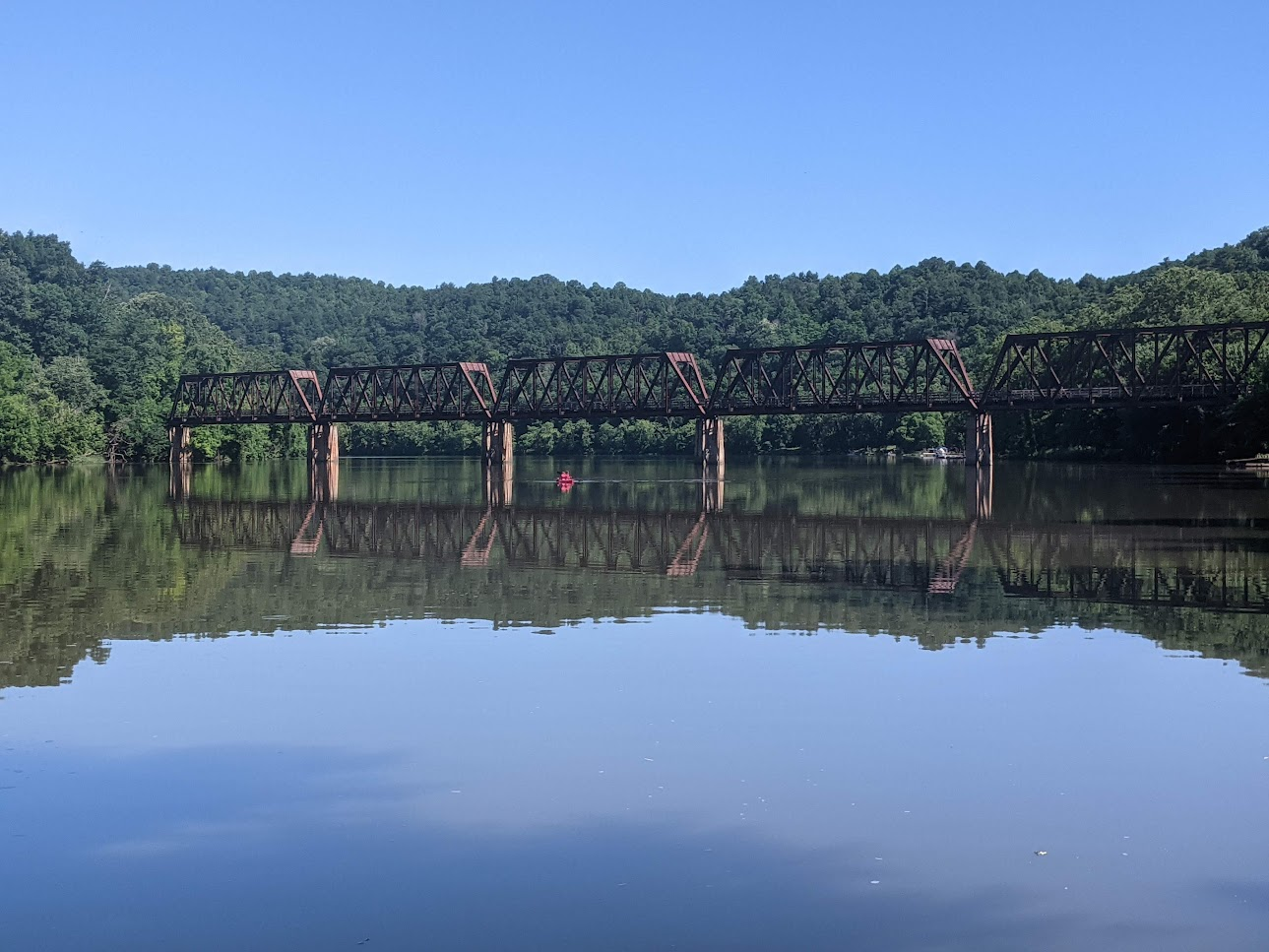
The Hiwassee Trestle Bridge spanning Claytor Lake in Pulaski County, Virginia

The New River Trail State Park, a rail trail that was built on top of an abandoned Norfolk Southern Railway right-of-way, follows part of the shoreline of Claytor Lake and crosses it on the Hiwassee Bridge. The 951-foot-long (290 m) bridge was built in 1931 by the Virginia Bridge and Iron Co. of Roanoke, a subsidiary of the Norfolk and Western Railway.

== Recreational activities ==
Popular activities at Claytor Lake include powerboating, sailing and various watersports.

Fishing has also become a major attraction at Claytor Lake. The most plentiful fish in the lake are bluegill, a form of sunfish. Most commonly they are in the 6 to 8 in (15 to 20 cm) range and weigh less than a pound. Catfish are also popular in Claytor Lake, some of them getting quite large (well over 50 pounds (23 kg)). The main sporting varieties are largemouth bass, smallmouth bass and striped bass. Large and small mouth bass fishing tournaments are a regular seasonal event at Claytor Lake with weights of 15 to 20 lb (6.8 to 9.1 kg) per fisherman being an average winning catch. All tournament fishing is catch and release and most is done by local clubs. Striped bass fishing occurs year-round with various techniques. The average "striper" (as they are commonly known) is about 8 pounds (3.6 kg) but catches close to 30 pounds (14 kg) have been reported.

The Virginia state record hybrid striped bass was caught in Claytor Lake on March 16, 2016. It weighed 15 pounds 13 ounces (7.2 kg). A Virginia state record spotted bass was caught on January 1, 2020, which weighed 4 pounds 12 ounces (2.2 kg).

Several high cliffs of shale rock ring the lake shoreline. This material is generally loose and unstable, and therefore climbing is not permitted.

The Blue Ridge Mountains Council of the Boy Scouts of America used to operate the Claytor Lake Aquatics Base on the shore of the lake. It offered sailing, rowing, and other watersports such as wakeboarding to the Boy Scouts who spent a week there during the summer. It also offered a program to earn a PADI scuba diving certification over the course of the week. Due to declining participation the base was sold in May of 2024 for $2.7 million to the real estate firm Shah Development.
