= Claytor Lake State Park =

State park in Virginia, USA

- IUCN category III (natural monument or feature)
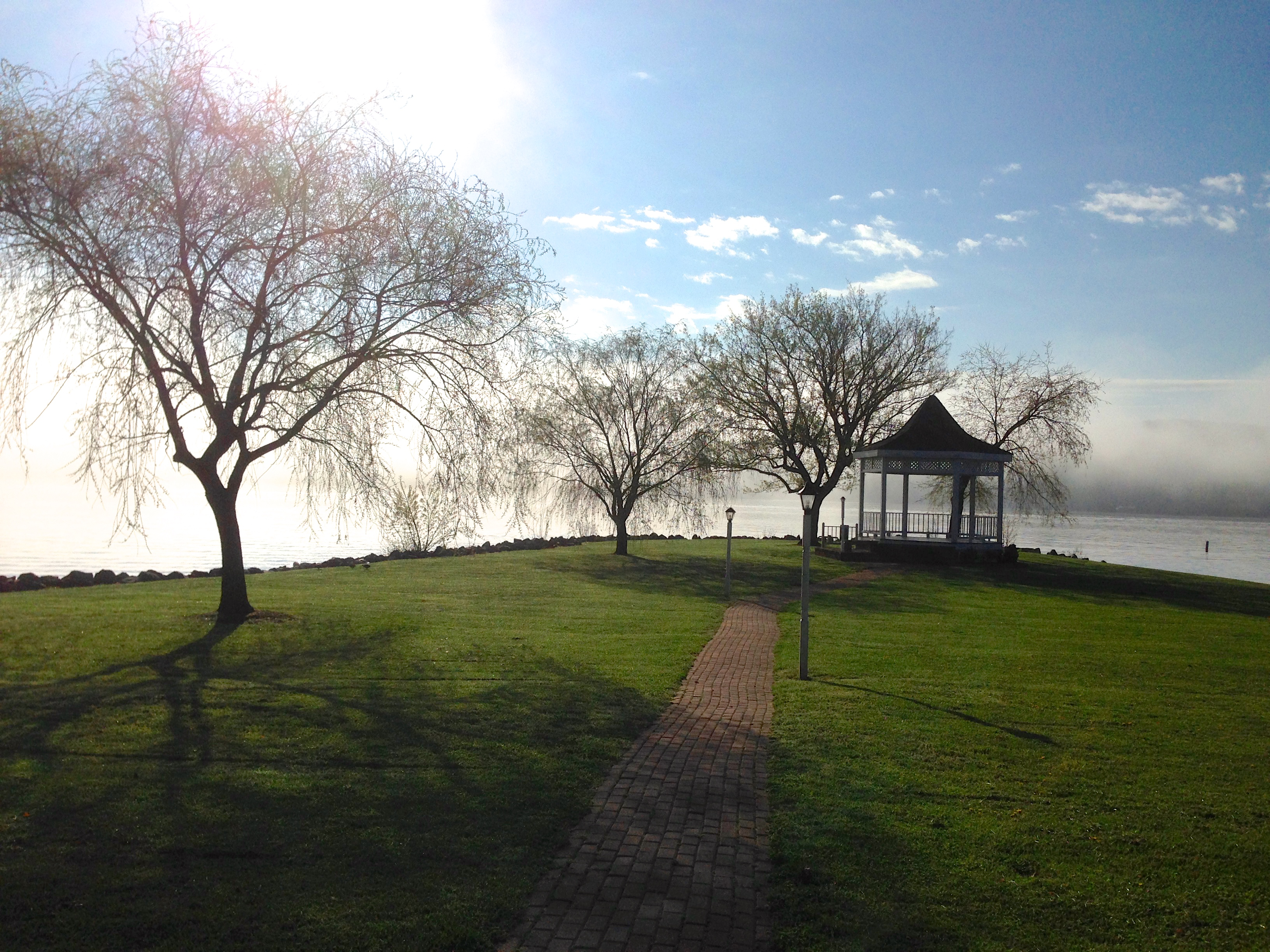
- Photo of morning at Claytor Lake State Park, Virginia, USA

- Location within Virginia Location within the United States
- Location: Pulaski County, Virginia, USA
- Nearest city: Dublin VA
- Coordinates: 37°3′32″N 80°37′42″W
- Area: 472 acres (191 ha)
- Established: 1951
- Governing body: Virginia Department of Conservation and Recreation

Claytor Lake State Park is a 472-acre (191 ha) state park in Pulaski County, Virginia, in the United States. The park is located on Claytor Lake, a 4,500-acre (18 km^{2}), 21-mile-long (34 km) reservoir on the New River formed by Claytor Dam, which is used to generate hydroelectric power by the Appalachian Power Company. The reservoir is named for William Graham Claytor (1886–1971) of nearby Roanoke, a former vice president of Appalachian Power who supervised construction of the dam and creation of the lake.

Claytor Lake State Park has hiking trails, a freshwater swimming beach, boating and fishing opportunities, a full-service marina, visitor center, concession, lakeside cabins, camping with full hookups, interpretive programs and six rental shelters accommodating large groups. In addition to this, many housing projects have been created around the area due to the enticing lake-front properties.

The Haven B. Howe House is used as a Nature Exhibit Center that focuses on the lake's wildlife habitat. It was added to the National Register of Historic Places in 2008.

== See also ==
- List of Virginia state parks
