= National Register of Historic Places listings in Radford, Virginia =

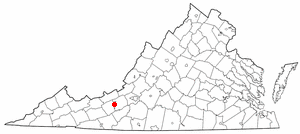
Location of Radford in Virginia

This is a list of the National Register of Historic Places listings in Radford, Virginia.

This is intended to be a complete list of the properties and districts on the National Register of Historic Places in the independent city of Radford, Virginia, United States. The locations of National Register properties and districts for which the latitude and longitude coordinates are included below, may be seen in a Google map.

There are 8 properties and districts listed on the National Register in the city, including 1 National Historic Landmark.

This National Park Service list is complete through NPS recent listings posted June 20, 2025.

== Current listings ==
	Name on the Register	Image	Date listed	Location	Description
1	Arnheim	Arnheim	May 30, 2002 (#02000589)	40 Dalton Dr. 37°08′11″N 80°34′08″W	
2	East Radford Historic District	East Radford Historic District	May 11, 2000 (#00000491)	Norwood, Stockton, and Downey Sts., and Grove Ave. 37°08′23″N 80°33′24″W	
3	Glencoe	Glencoe	November 22, 2000 (#00001439)	600 Unruh Drive; 37°07′56″N 80°34′50″W	
4	Halwyck	Halwyck	August 29, 1997 (#97001074)	915 Tyler Ave. 37°07′55″N 80°32′55″W	
5	Harvey House	Harvey House	July 30, 1976 (#76002228)	706 Harvey St. 37°07′41″N 80°34′12″W	
6	Ingles Bottom Archeological Sites	Ingles Bottom Archeological Sites	December 5, 1978 (#78003032)	On the New River across from Ingles Ferry; 37°06′13″N 80°35′01″W	
7	La Riviere	La Riviere	August 16, 1994 (#94000991)	5 Ingles St. 37°06′58″N 80°35′38″W	
8	West Radford Commercial Historic District	West Radford Commercial Historic District	January 19, 2005 (#04001541)	100, 200, and 300 blocks of W. Main St. 37°08′04″N 80°34′28″W	

== See also ==
- List of National Historic Landmarks in Virginia
- National Register of Historic Places listings in Virginia
