= Red Hen =

Red Hen may refer to:

- The Little Red Hen, a folk tale
- Red Hen Press, American publisher founded in 1984
- Red Hen restaurant controversy in Lexington, Virginia (2018)
- Red Hen Systems, American technology company founded in 1997
- Red rail, an extinct bird
- South Australian Railways Redhen railcar, Australian railcar built between 1955 and 1971
- A 1980s UK restaurant chain at Welcome_Break service stations
