= John Blair Radford =

American physician and farmer, namesake of City of Radford, Virginia

John B. Radford
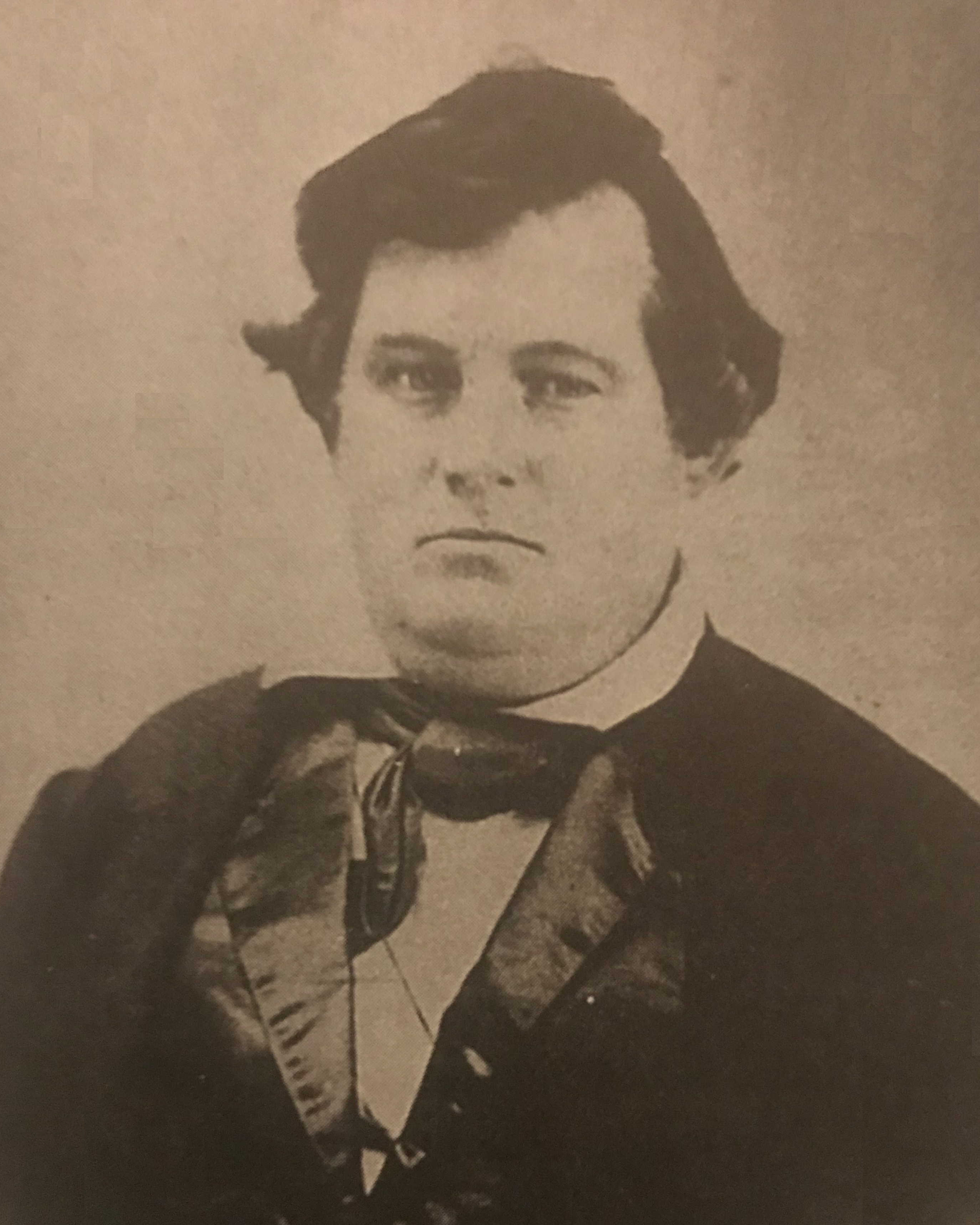
- Portrait of Radford, c. 1850s
- Born: John Blair Radford; April 20, 1813; Bedford County, Virginia, U.S.
- Died: June 30, 1872 (aged 59); Central Depot, Virginia, U.S.
- Burial place: Arnheim
- Education: University of Pennsylvania
- Occupations: Physician; farmer
- Political party: Democratic; Opposition (1858); Know Nothing (1855)
- Spouse: Elizabeth Campbell Taylor (m. 1836)
- Children: 7, including J. Lawrence

John Blair Radford (April 20, 1813 – June 30, 1872) was an American physician, businessman, farmer, and namesake of Radford, Virginia.

== Biography ==
Radford was born in Bedford County, Virginia, the son of William Radford and Elizabeth Moseley. He attended medical school in Philadelphia. In 1836, Radford married Elizabeth Campbell Taylor and they had 7 children, including Nannie, who married Confederate General Gabriel C. Wharton, and James Lawrence, who served two terms in the Virginia House of Delegates.

After their marriage, John and Elizabeth moved to Radford, which at the time was a community known as "Lovely Mount." John opened a medical practice in the area and was one of the few practicing physicians in the region. Between 1838 and 1840, Radford oversaw the building of the Arnheim plantation to serve as his family home.

In addition to his work as a physician and his plantation's agricultural activities, Radford was active in various other commercial and railroad ventures. In 1844, Radford was appointed by the Virginia Board of Public Works as a Director of the LaFayette and English Ferry Turnpike Company.

In 1864, during the American Civil War, Radford's Arnheim home was shelled by cannons during the Battle of New River Bridge, as the Union Army mistakenly assumed the home to be the headquarters of the Confederacy.

=== Death ===
Radford died in 1872 and is interred at the Radford Family Cemetery in Radford.

== Legacy ==
Local residents began to refer to the Lovely Mount area as "Radford" in the years following Radford's death. The City of Radford was officially incorporated in January 1892 and was formally named after Radford.

A bronze statue of Radford is displayed in the Radford municipal building.

== See also ==
- Radford, Virginia
