= East Radford Historic District =

Historic district in Virginia, United States

- U.S. National Register of Historic Places
- U.S. Historic district
- Virginia Landmarks Register
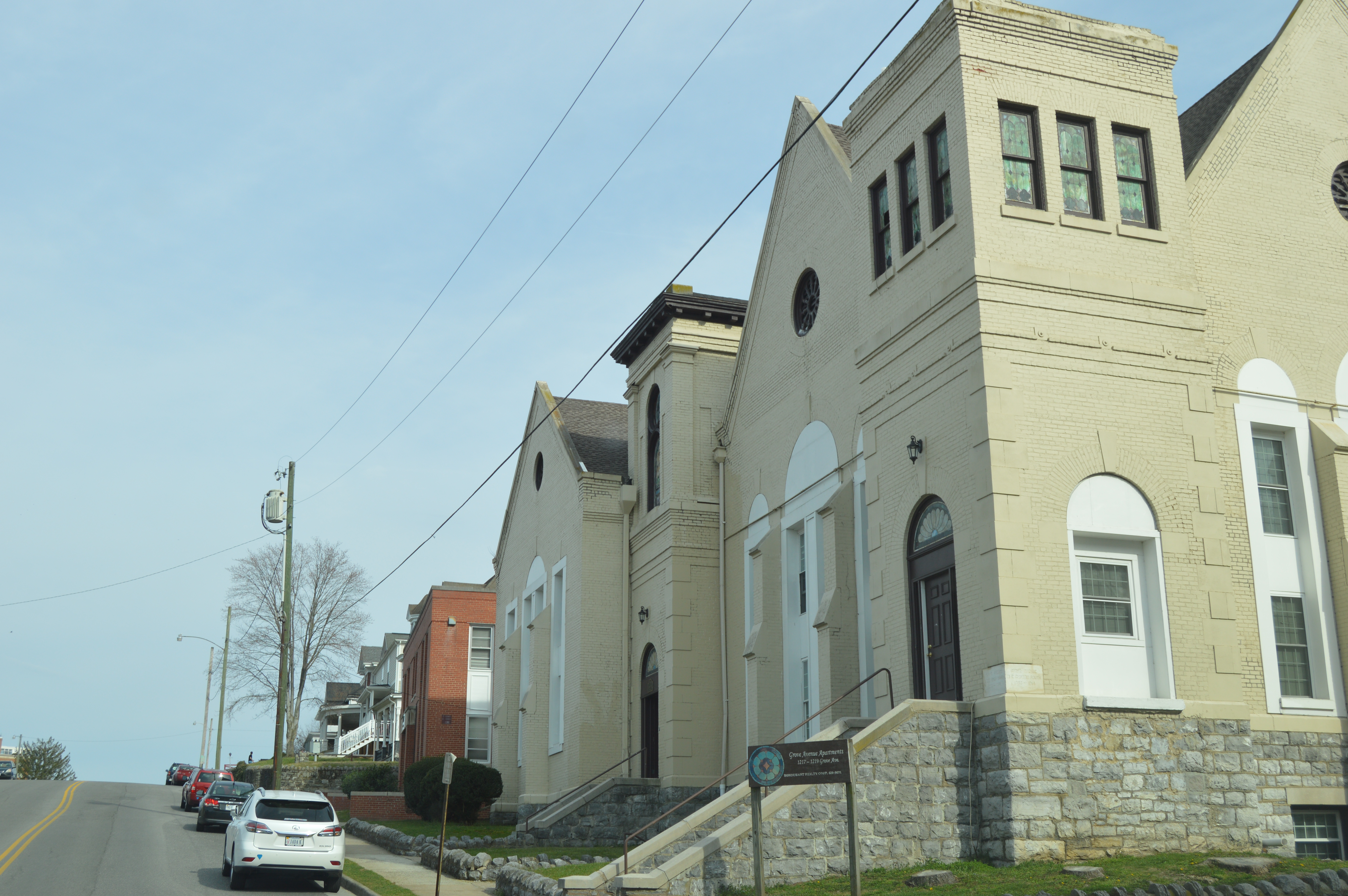
- Grove Avenue east of Third Avenue

- Location within Virginia Location within the United States
- Location: Norwood, Stockton, and Downey Sts., and Grove Ave., Radford, Virginia
- Coordinates: 36°50′31″N 76°18′40″W
- Area: 141 acres (57 ha)
- Built: 1892
- Architect: W.D. Lorton, et al.
- Architectural style: Queen Anne, Colonial Revival, et al.
- NRHP reference No.: 00000491
- VLR No.: 126-0084, 126-0084-0226

Significant dates
- Added to NRHP: May 11, 2000
- Designated VLR: March 15, 2000, October 20, 2005

East Radford Historic District is a national historic district located at Radford, Virginia. It encompasses 302 contributing buildings and 5 contributing structures in a mixed residential and commercial section of Radford, comprising most of the historic boundaries of the town of Central Depot. It was developed between 1866 and 1916, and includes notable examples of Queen Anne and Colonial Revival style architecture. Notable buildings include the Shanks House, the Ward-Carter House, Fraternity Building, Carson's Drug Store, Shumate Store, Alleghany Hotel, Simon Block, Bond Building, Williamson House, Maplehurst (the Arthur Roberts House), Dobbins Apartments, Belle Heth School (c. 1912), Grove Avenue Methodist Episcopal Church (1913), M. Jackson Hardware Company (1918), and Farmers' and Merchants' Bank.

It was listed on the National Register of Historic Places in 2000.
