= West Radford Commercial Historic District =

Historic district in Virginia, United States

- U.S. National Register of Historic Places
- U.S. Historic district
- Virginia Landmarks Register
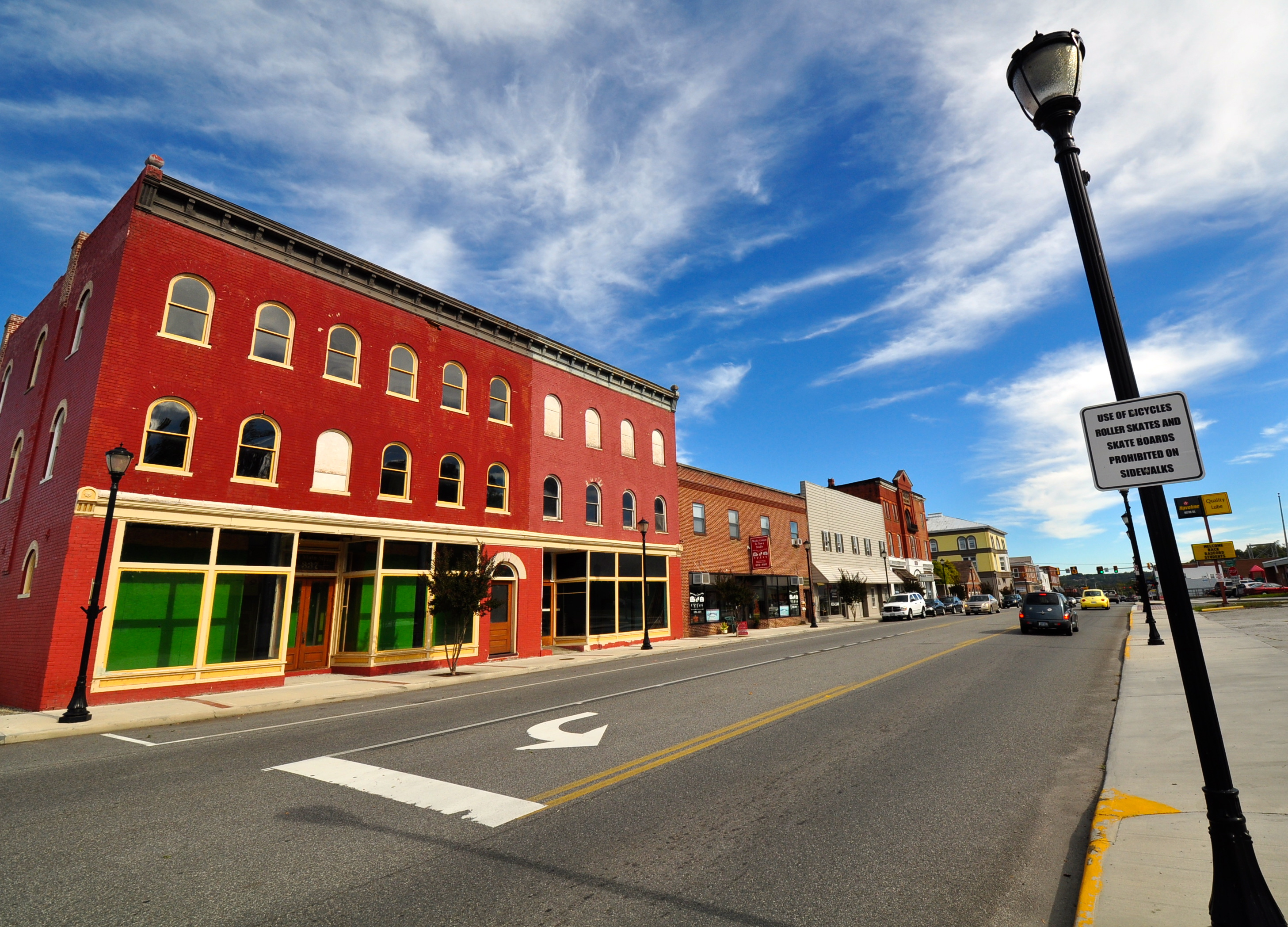
- West Radford Commercial Historic District, October 2013

- Location within Virginia Location within the United States
- Location: 100,200 and 300 blocks of W. Main St., Radford, Virginia
- Coordinates: 37°8′1″N 80°34′29″W
- Area: 8 acres (3.2 ha)
- Built: 1890
- Architect: Kennedy, Robert Gray
- Architectural style: Romanesque, Early Commercial
- NRHP reference No.: 04001541
- VLR No.: 126-5005

Significant dates
- Added to NRHP: January 19, 2005
- Designated VLR: December 1, 2004

West Radford Commercial Historic District is a national historic district located at Radford, Virginia. It encompasses 19 contributing buildings in a commercial section of West Radford. It was developed after 1890, and includes several fine examples of Victorian and early-20th century commercial buildings. Notable buildings include the Radford Trust Co. Building, the Ashmead Building and the Commercial Block.

It was listed on the National Register of Historic Places in 2005.
