= La Riviere (Radford, Virginia) =

Historic house in Virginia, United States

- U.S. National Register of Historic Places
- Virginia Landmarks Register
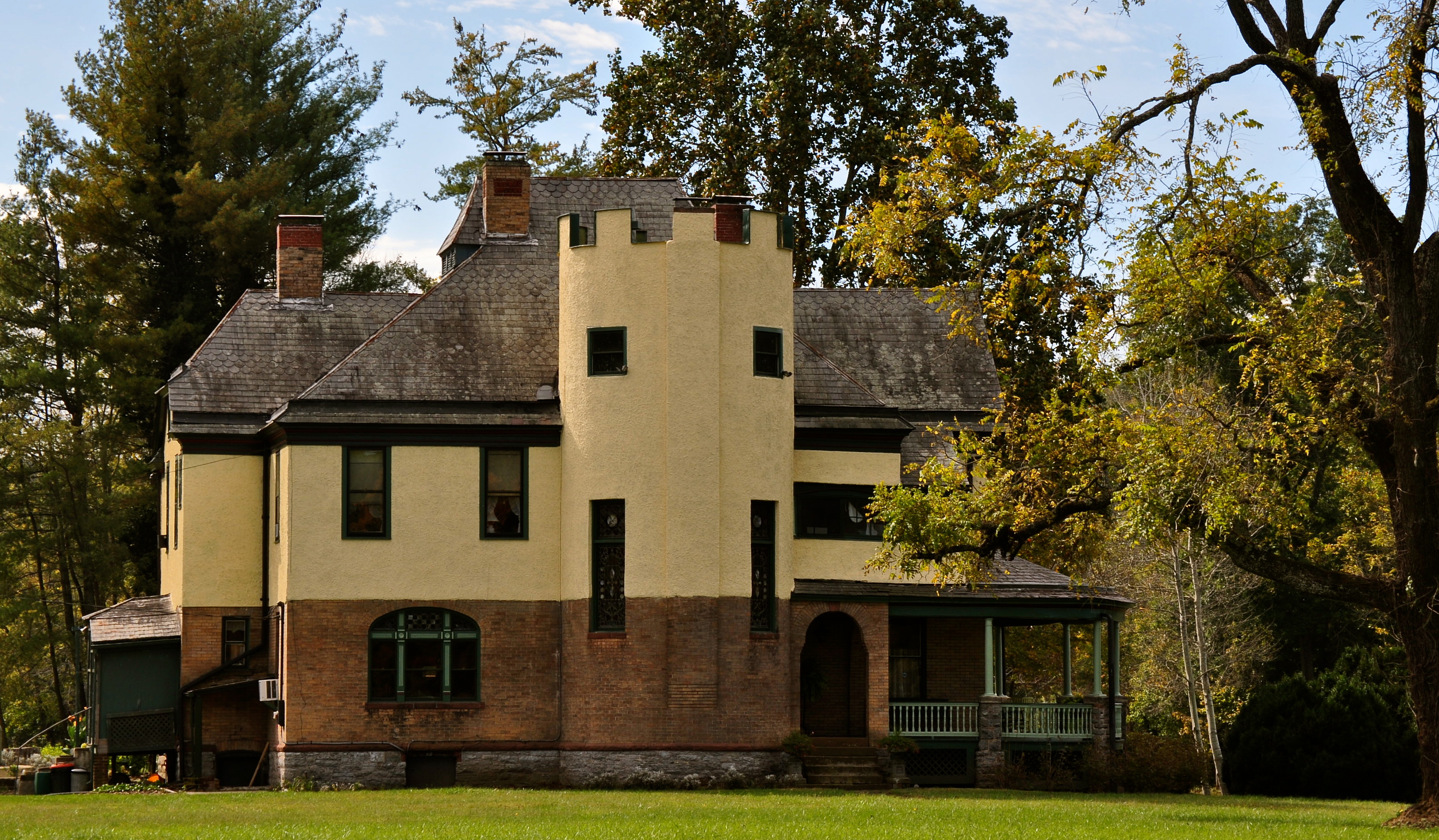
- La Riviere, October 2013

- Location within Virginia Location within the United States
- Location: 5 Ingles St., Radford, Virginia
- Coordinates: 37°6′58″N 80°35′40″W
- Area: 20 acres (8.1 ha)
- Built: 1892-1893
- Architect: Ingles, William
- Architectural style: Queen Anne
- NRHP reference No.: 94000991
- VLR No.: 126-0008

Significant dates
- Added to NRHP: August 16, 1994
- Designated VLR: June 15, 1994

La Riviere, also known as the William Ingles House, is a historic home located at Radford, Virginia. It was built in 1892–1893 by Captain Billy Ingles, the great-grandson of Colonel William Ingles, and is a two-story Queen Anne house with a brick first story and a stuccoed frame second story. The house sits on rock-faced limestone blocks and has a slate-sheathed hipped roof. It features a three-story battlemented tower, a conservatory, and a curving wraparound porch. Also on the property are a contributing cook's house, garage, ice house, drive, and wall and gate.

It was listed on the National Register of Historic Places in 1994.
