= Crumb and Get It bakery incident =

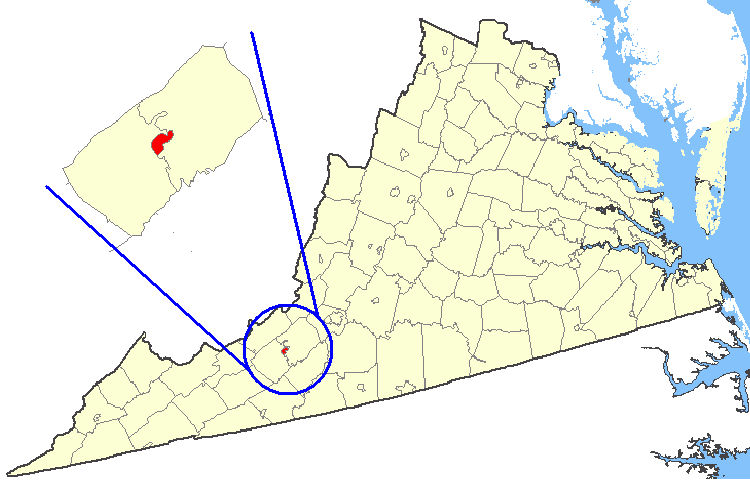
Radford, Virginia is in rural Virginia, about a four-hour drive from Washington, D.C.

In the Crumb and Get It bakery incident (August 15, 2012), a bakery owner in Radford, Virginia, declined to host a campaign event for then-Vice President Joe Biden, citing political differences. The incident sparked significant media coverage and a surge in business for the bakery. The baker was invited to introduce Republican vice presidential nominee Paul Ryan at a political rally the following week.

== The incident ==
Just after 10:00am on Wednesday, August 15, 2012, an advance team from Joe Biden's campaign entered the three-month old "mom-and-pop" Crumb and Get It bakery, asking owner Chris McMurray if he would host an unscheduled media event, but McMurray politely declined, citing political differences. McMurray said that the exchange was very kind—not heated, hoarse, or ill-mannered—a matter of political difference ("convictions about my faith" and then-President Obama's attitude toward business), with no offense to Biden. McMurray later explained that he "would not like to be used as a photo op for (Obama/Biden's) campaign". Biden's event was held at the nearby River City Grill instead.

== Aftermath ==
A television reporter for WDBJ, Roanoke, Virginia, received a tip about the occurrence, a resultant story being picked up by the Drudge Report and various conservative blogs. The coverage led to an outpouring of support and a surge in business the next day that caused it to close down at 1:15pm because it ran out of food. McMurray opened shops in Fredericksburg and Lakeland before later shutting its doors.

McMurray's disagreement stemmed in part from his reaction to Obama's "You didn't build that" remark the previous month in Roanoke. Republican vice presidential nominee Paul Ryan requested that McMurray introduce him at a rally in Roanoke the following week, when McMurray told the crowds "We (small business owners) did build it". Three non-partisan fact-checkers subsequently found Obama's remark to refer to public infrastructure and not to the small businesses themselves.

Reports that Secret Service agents subsequently entered and thanked McMurray "for standing up and saying no" and "bought a whole bunch of cookies and cupcakes" were later contradicted by a Secret Service spokesman who said the agents were there to thank the shop owners for their trouble and apologize for any inconvenience the advance team may have caused.

The Crumb and Get It incident "re-entered the national conversation" after the 2018 Red Hen restaurant controversy. At that time, the owner of an unrelated Pennsylvania bakery of the same name reported being "slammed with messages" concerning the incident in Virginia six years earlier.

== Similar incidents ==
The Crumb and Get It incident was among similar incidents that "re-entered the national conversation" in the wake of the 2018 Red Hen restaurant controversy.

In the 2012 Masterpiece Cakeshop incident, a Colorado baker refused to make a customized wedding cake for a gay couple due to the owner's religious opposition to their marriage.

In 2015, a county clerk in Kentucky, Kim Davis, refused on personal religious grounds to issue marriage licenses to same-sex couples.

In the June 2018 Red Hen restaurant controversy, a restaurant co-owner in Lexington, Virginia who disapproved of President Trump's administration's policies asked White House Press Secretary Sarah Huckabee Sanders to leave the restaurant. Contrasting with the generally positive reaction received by McMurray, after Sanders tweeted about the incident, the restaurant quickly became the object of an online troll campaign, extreme Yelp reviews, and a negative tweet from President Trump himself.
