= J. Lawrence Radford =

American politician

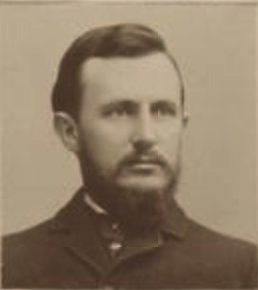
- Portrait of Radford, c. 1891

Member of the Virginia House of Delegates from Montgomery County
- In office December 4, 1889 – December 6, 1893
- Preceded by: David Riner
- Succeeded by: John U. Sumpter

Personal details
- Born: James Lawrence Radford; September 15, 1856
- Died: October 20, 1901 (aged 45) New River, Virginia, U.S.
- Party: Democratic
- Parent: John Blair Radford (father)
- Education: Virginia Tech

James Lawrence Radford (September 15, 1856 – October 20, 1901) was an American politician who served in the Virginia House of Delegates.
