= Ingles Bottom Archeological Sites =

Archaeological sites in Virginia, United States

- U.S. National Register of Historic Places
- U.S. Historic district
- Virginia Landmarks Register
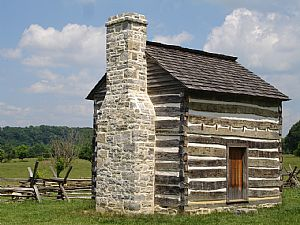
- Reproduction at the Ingles cabin site

- Location within Virginia Location within the United States
- Nearest city: Radford, Virginia
- Area: 154 acres (62 ha)
- Built: 1762
- NRHP reference No.: 78003032
- VLR No.: 126-0004

Significant dates
- Added to NRHP: December 5, 1978
- Designated VLR: June 15, 1976

Ingles Bottom Archeological Sites is a set of archaeological sites, and national historic district located along the New River near Radford, Montgomery County, Virginia. The district encompasses a variety of archaeological sites relating to human occupation from 8000 B.C. to the present. It includes the site of a log cabin built about 1762, as the home of William Ingles (1729-1782) and his wife Mary Draper Ingles (1732-1815). The property also includes the site of a stable, the Ingles family cemetery, a tannery, a blacksmith shop, and the Ingles Ferry Tavern.

Excavations during 1974-1976 uncovered the remains of an unpalisaded Native American village dating to 1250–1500 CE. Approximately 100 sherds of limestone-tempered pottery and several large chert projectile points were dated to the early Late Woodland period. In addition, bone tools and shellfish remains were identified, together with projectile points resembling Savannah River points, dating from ca. 3000-1500 BCE, during the Late Archaic period.

Excavations of the Ingles Ferry site initiated in 1974 covered 1400 square feet and found over 30,000 artifacts from the late 18th century. The dig uncovered a tannery as well as the foundation of the one-room cabin where Mary Draper Ingles lived during her final years, which measured 14.5 feet by 16 feet.

It was listed on the National Register of Historic Places in 1978.
