= Savannah River point =

Late Archaic period projectile point

The Savannah River point (also, Savannah River Stemmed or Appalachian Stemmed) is a Late Archaic period projectile point commonly found in the southeastern United States. The point is large, triangular, and has a square stem. It is relatively thin for its size. Savannah River points are 44 to 170 mm long, 35 to 70 mm wide, and 7 to 12 mm thick. A Small Savannah River point, a Cattle Run variant, an Otarre Stemmed variant, and a short-stemmed variant have also been described. The type was first described based on finds at Stallings Island. The points were formed by percussion flaking and finished using pressure flaking.
