= Red Hen Systems =

Red Hen Systems, Inc.
- Type: Private
- Industry: Technology; Spatial Media
- Founded: Fort Collins, CO (1997)
- Headquarters: Fort Collins, CO, U.S. 40°33′03.87″N 105°04′54.96″W
- Key people: Neil Havermale, Founder/President
- Website: www.redhensystems.com

Red Hen Systems, Inc. is a technology company that develops integrated hardware and software for multimedia asset mapping. Their spatial digital video recorders (DVRs) and still cameras instantly geotag video and still photos at the time of data collection. Corresponding mapping software provides the capability to view photographs, video, and audio using GPS coordinates.

== History ==
In Fall 1997, Neil Havermale and Ken Burgess founded Red Hen Systems, Inc. as a software engineering and systems manufacturer, developing in-field data collection, harvest yield recording systems, and input prescription mapping software for agricultural applications. Red Hen Systems, Inc. became an early leader in using GPS (Global Positioning System) data to sample and map field data, as well as process and monitor crop yields.

A year later, the company was searching for a way to edge-detect entry into and exit from a field at harvest to better align crop yield maps. The result was the use of hand-held video recorders that evolved into a video mapping system, developed by Ken Burgess, to help crop scouts identify and locate weeds and pests in the field. This system soon proved there would be new uses for geo-referenced imagery beyond the agricultural field.

Today, Red Hen Systems provides technology to a wide variety of markets including GIS professionals, aerial video, the military, natural resource and environmental management, transportation, and utilities.

== Products ==
=== Photo Mapping Technology ===
Red Hen Systems produces two products for certain Nikon DSLR cameras capable of geotagging digital still images. The Blue2CAN connects the camera with a Bluetooth-enabled GPS unit, allowing the camera’s software to geotag photos as they are taken. For non-Bluetooth applications, the DX-GPS includes a Garmin Geko unit designed to connect directly to the camera. Red Hen Systems is also a pioneer in smartphone integration, providing Blue2CAN users the ability to link their Android smart phone's GPS with the Blue2CAN and its Nikon hosts as of September 2010.

=== Video Mapping Technology ===
The integrated hardware and software produced by Red Hen Systems create Geospatially Enabled Media (GEM). GEM is a full-motion video metadata recording system which associates the what (video) with the who, what, when, where, and why's via UTC, GPS, and other encoding. This is done by DAC and ADC recording of digital GPS and other metadata as an audible modem squelch into the left audio channel of a video camera's stereo recordings. The significance of this technology is that it allows for the editing of video while maintaining the integrity of its corresponding metadata. The encoding device that does this is referred to as a video mapping system, or VMS. Currently, there are multiple versions of this device capable of suiting many different applications. In addition to individual VMS units, Red Hen Systems produces packaged digital video recorder (DVR) solutions that store geo-referenced video as it is produced.

=== Software ===
The development of the VMS led to the creation of software to decode this audio signal. In 2001, Red Hen Systems received a patent of a method to match this metadata with the recorded images. The original software designed to do this was made to work with tape-based media (as opposed to digital), and was called VMS player. This early version was noted for its ease of use and flexibility since it supported maps from ESRI, a major producer of GIS products. Red Hen software has continued to evolve with video technology, moving from tape to mini-DVD to digital media, with each iteration allowing for more information.

Current offerings include hardware for mapping photo and video, and software for ESRI and non-ESRI applications, as well as a server for organization-wide content sharing.
