= Arnheim (Radford, Virginia) =

Historic house in Virginia, United States

- U.S. National Register of Historic Places
- Virginia Landmarks Register
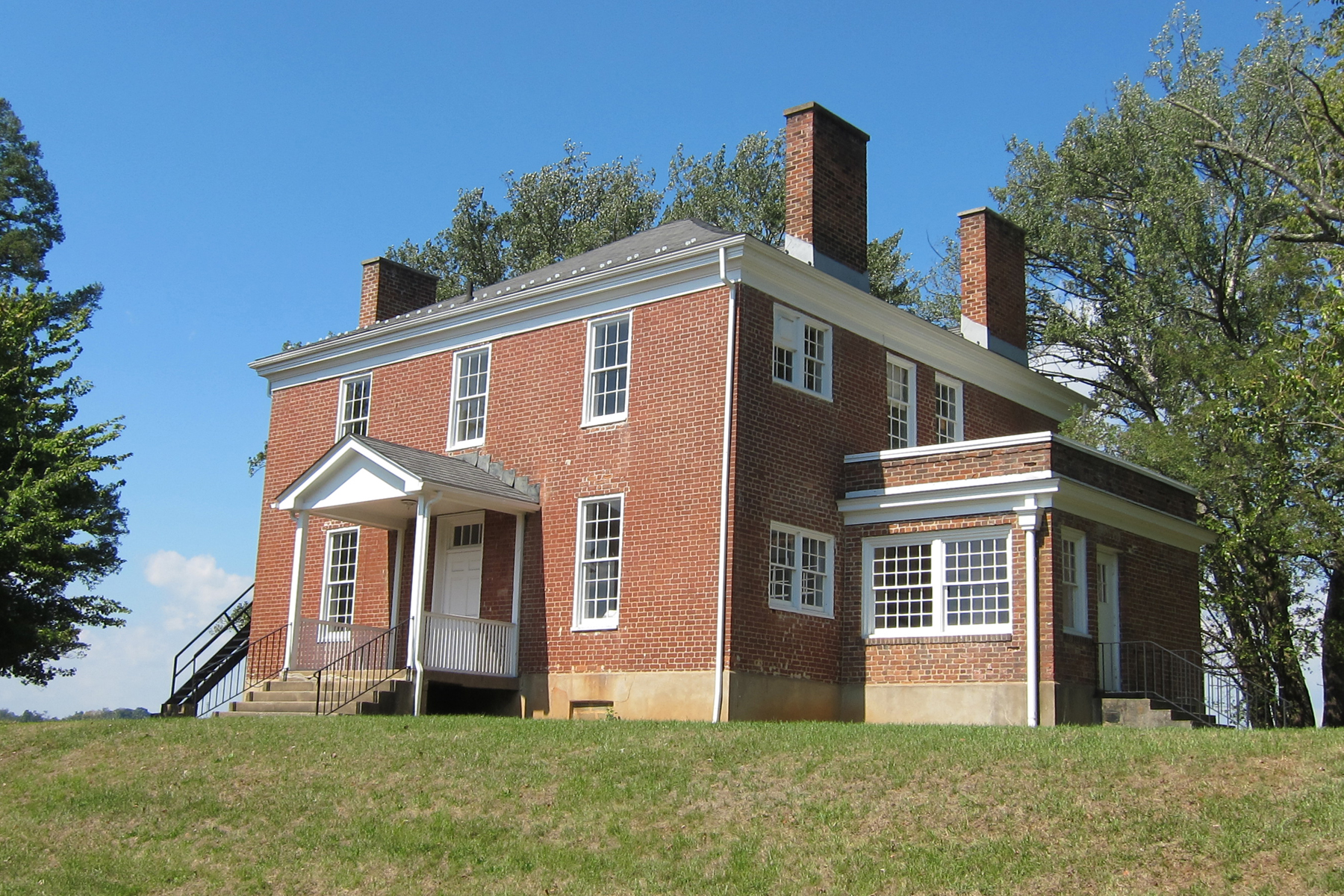
- Amhein, September 2012

- Location within Virginia Location within the United States
- Location: 40 Dalton Dr., Radford, Virginia
- Coordinates: 37°8′11″N 80°34′8″W
- Area: 1.1 acres (0.45 ha)
- Built: 1838–1840
- Architectural style: Federal, Greek Revival
- NRHP reference No.: 02000589
- VLR No.: 126-0002

Significant dates
- Added to NRHP: May 30, 2002
- Designated VLR: March 13, 2002, November 17, 2008

Arnheim is a historic plantation house located at Radford, Virginia. It was built between 1838 and 1840, and is a two-story, three-bay, Federal / Greek Revival–style brick dwelling. It is a symmetrical double-pile plan dwelling, 40 feet square, and sitting on a raised brick basement. In 1939, it was converted into a home economics annex for the adjacent Radford High School. Arnheim was built by Dr. John Blair Radford, for whom the City of Radford is named. The property also includes a documented contributing archaeological site.

It was listed on the National Register of Historic Places in 2002.
