= Red Hen restaurant controversy =

American political incident involving White House staffer

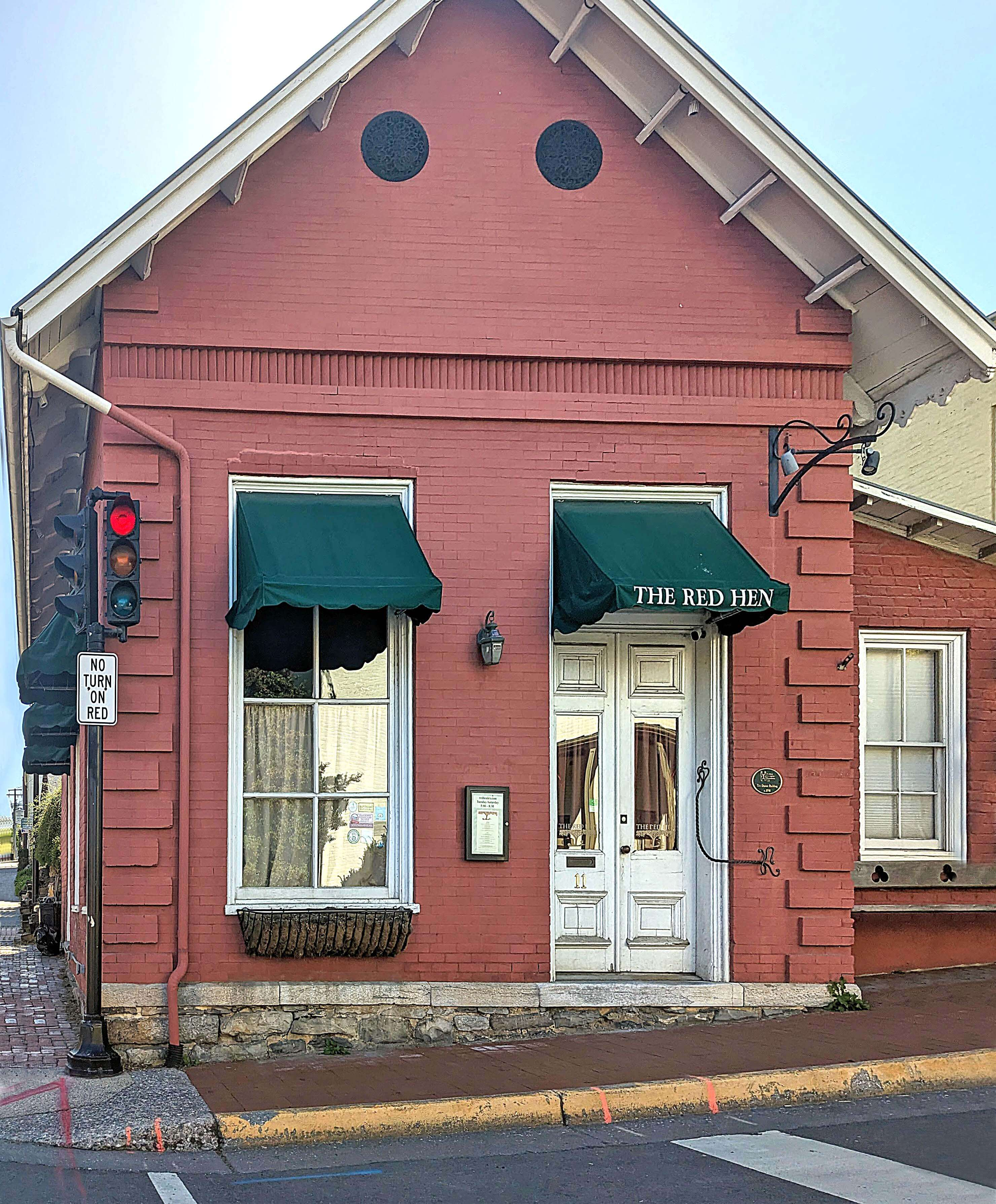
The Red Hen restaurant formerly at 11 East Washington Street in downtown Lexington, Virginia.

On June 22, 2018, a co-owner of The Red Hen restaurant in Lexington, Virginia, asked Sarah Huckabee Sanders, then the White House press secretary, to leave. The co-owner later cited Sanders' role in what they called the "inhumane and unethical" Trump administration in which Sanders had "publicly defended the president's cruelest policies." The Red Hen planned to cease operations at the end of December 2023 and rebrand as a new concept.

== Precipitating incident ==
The Red Hen was a "tiny farm-to-table restaurant" with 26 seats almost 200 miles (320 km) from Washington, D.C., in Lexington, Virginia. At about 8:00 pm on Friday, June 22, 2018, The Red Hen's chef telephoned the restaurant's co-owner Stephanie Wilkinson to report that Sarah Huckabee Sanders, the White House press secretary had entered the restaurant to dine with a group of about eight people. Wilkinson told The Washington Post that, after conferring with her employees, she told Sanders that the restaurant upholds standards "such as honesty, and compassion, and cooperation" and asked Sanders to leave, which Sanders did. Wilkinson related that the other people at Sanders' table had been served appetizers and were invited to stay, but they also left, Wilkinson saying their appetizers were on the house. In the morning press briefing of Monday, June 25, Sanders said that she and her husband went home.

== Political and journalistic responses ==
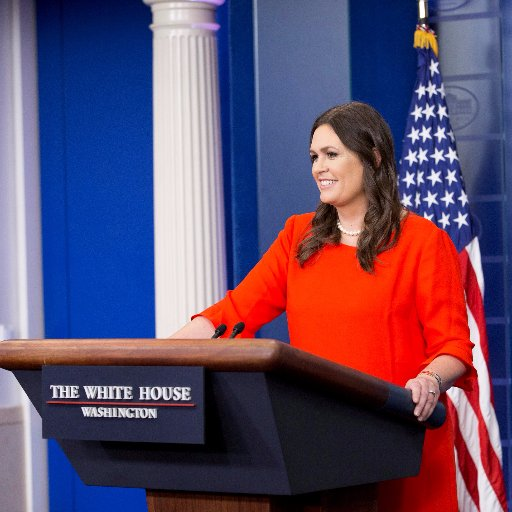
White House Press Secretary Sarah Huckabee Sanders was at the center of the controversy

=== Restaurant co-owner ===
A June 25 Washington Post article quoted restaurant co-owner Stephanie Wilkinson as saying she was "not a huge fan of confrontation" and wanted her business to thrive but that this felt like "the moment in our democracy when people have to make uncomfortable actions and decisions to uphold their morals." Wilkinson explained that she believed Sanders—significantly, a public official—served in an "inhumane and unethical" administration and "publicly defended the president's cruelest policies."

=== Trump administration ===
After a server made a social media post that caused wider media attention, at 10:53am the next day (Saturday, June 23), Sanders tweeted, "Last night I was told by the owner of Red Hen in Lexington, VA, to leave because I work for @POTUS, and I politely left. Her actions say far more about her than about me." In the press briefing of Monday, June 25, Sanders spoke out against "hate and vandalism" against the restaurant and also said that "calls for harassment and push for any Trump supporter to avoid the public is unacceptable." On about August 2, in the context of her accusation that the press verbally assaults the president and members of his administration, Sanders said that as far as she knew, she is "the first press secretary in the history of the United States that's required Secret Service protection."

At 7:41am on Monday, June 25, President Donald Trump tweeted that the restaurant should focus more on cleaning its "filthy canopies, doors and windows (badly needs a paint job) rather than refusing to serve a fine person like Sarah Huckabee Sanders," adding that "I always had a rule, if a restaurant is dirty on the outside, it is dirty on the inside!" (Virginia health department records show the restaurant "easily passed its most recent inspections.")

After comments made by Congresswoman Maxine Waters calling for her supporters to confront Trump Cabinet officials in public spaces like restaurants, President Trump responded on Twitter by saying, "Congresswoman Maxine Waters, an extraordinarily low IQ person, has become, together with Nancy Pelosi, the Face of the Democrat Party. She has just called for harm to supporters, of which there are many, of the Make America Great Again movement. Be careful what you wish for Max!"

=== Other political and journalistic responses ===
Following the incident, Congresswoman Maxine Waters encouraged her supporters to act similarly, saying, "Let's make sure we show up wherever we have to show up. And if you see anybody from that Cabinet in a restaurant, in a department store, at a gasoline station, you get out and you create a crowd. And you push back on them. And you tell them they're not welcome anymore, anywhere" and "For these members of his Cabinet who remain and try to defend [Trump], they're not going to be able to go to a restaurant, they're not going to be able to stop at a gas station, they're not going to be able to shop [at] a department store. The people are going to turn on them, they're going to protest, they're going to absolutely harass them."

House Minority Leader and fellow Democrat Nancy Pelosi publicly disagreed with Waters' statements regarding harassing Trump administration officials, calling this "unacceptable" and calling for civility, saying, "we must strive to make America beautiful again."

The controversy caused numerous commentators to write on the issue of civility toward political figures. Karl J. Salzmann wrote in The National Review that "in the absence of civility, democracy becomes mob rule" and that "without civility we turn toward chaos, anarchy, and ultimately constitutional perdition." In contrast, Professor Gerald Postema distinguished political implications from moral considerations, writing that "we must resist rushing to the judgment of incivility. Norms of civility can be oppressive, a potent means of muzzling legitimate demands of accountability. Civility should not rule out vigorous articulation of one's moral views."

== Legal issues ==
On June 23, 2018, Walter Shaub, past director of the U.S. Office of Government Ethics under Presidents Obama and Trump (through July 2017), wrote that Sanders' tweet on the same day violated federal law pertaining to Standards of Ethical Conduct and Misuse of Position. Shaub wrote that Sanders used her official government Twitter account, having three million followers, "to condemn a private business for personal reasons. Seeks to coerce business by using her office to get public to pressure it. Violates endorsements ban too, which has an obvious corollary for discouraging patronage." In the press briefing of Monday, June 25, Sanders said that over a dozen reporters had contacted her and that multiple news stories had already been issued, so she considered it to be "news of the day" to which she responded on her official government Twitter account.

Some commentators perceived a parallel between the Red Hen incident and the facts underlying the Supreme Court's June 4, 2018, Masterpiece Cakeshop decision, ruling in favor of a Colorado baker who refused to make a custom wedding cake for a gay couple based on the baker's religious opposition to their marriage. However, in contrast to the Federal Civil Rights Act of 1964, which bars discrimination based on race, religion, national origin, and color, Virginia state law does not provide that political affiliation is a protected trait against discrimination.

== Subsequent occurrences ==
The restaurant's Yelp page was quickly flooded with mostly one- and five-star reviews created by opponents and supporters of Wilkinson's action. As of June 25, Yelp was actively monitoring the listing and deleting postings that were perceived as being motivated "by the news coverage itself [rather] than [by] the reviewer's personal consumer experience with the business."

Fortune magazine reported that, as a result of a tweet by Donald Trump, an unaffiliated District of Columbia restaurant with the same name was targeted by conservatives with negative Yelp reviews and denunciations on Twitter. Other unaffiliated restaurants with the same name in Swedesboro, New Jersey and Old Saybrook, Connecticut, as well as against the Olde Red Hen in Ontario and the Little Red Hen in Muntinlupa, the Philippines, were similarly targeted with negative reviews and criticism on Twitter.

Supporters and opponents demonstrated outside the restaurant on June 26, resulting in one arrest and the closure of the street in front of the business for two hours. The restaurant remained closed for almost two weeks after the incident, experiencing a protest on its July 9 re-opening but receiving an increase in business in succeeding days.

By June 27, the URL of the restaurant's website had been redirected to a site selling erectile dysfunction medication, a Malwarebytes security specialist indicating that the redirect was likely from scammers seeking to "capitalize on heightened internet traffic to the website because of the headlines" rather than for political purposes.

It was reported on June 26 that Sanders was to receive temporary Secret Service protection at her home, protection that Sanders confirmed on about August 2.

On September 2, The Roanoke Times reported that the Rockbridge Regional Tourism Board had agreed to spend $5,000 monthly from July through September to increase positive digital marketing in response to negative national media coverage after the incident. The money was taken from an emergency fund comprising about 20% ($160,000) of its $800,000 overall annual budget.

In May 2019, co-owner Stephanie Wilkinson wrote in The Washington Post that the restaurant had been receiving hate mail for nearly a year, but "[f]or every hateful message, there was one of gratitude." She reported that "business is still good," and "to everyone who might be fearful about taking a stand, I say don't be. Resistance is not futile, for you or your business."

In November 2023, the restaurant's owners announced that the Red Hen would cease operations at the end of the year and reopen in early 2024 under a new name. The Facebook page lists the restaurant being rebranded as Zunzun, directing people to zunzunlex.com, their new website.

== Similar incidents ==
The incident ignited a political debate about civility, invoking comparisons to similar incidents. Commentators referenced the 2012 Masterpiece Cakeshop incident in which a Colorado baker refused to make a custom wedding cake for a gay couple, the 2012 Crumb and Get It bakery incident in which a Virginia baker declined to host a campaign media event for then-Vice President Joe Biden, and the 2015 refusal by county clerk Kim Davis to issue a marriage license to a same-sex couple in Kentucky.

On November 30, 2022, a restaurant in Richmond, Virginia, canceled an event reserved by Family Foundation of Virginia, a faith-based nonprofit that opposed the Respect for Marriage Act."

Huckabee Sanders was again expelled from a restaurant in March 2026. She was asked to leave The Croissanterie in Little Rock. The restaurant explained the action by saying "Allowing her to stay risked being perceived as a lack of support for the community that makes up the majority of our team, as well as their families and friends... Ultimately, we made the decision to support our employees and guests who expressed they were uncomfortable." Huckabee Sanders' take on the incident was "Arkansans are known for their warm hospitality, and while that restaurant didn’t meet that standard, my administration will continue to focus on lifting Arkansans up, not tearing others down".
