= Lovely Mount =

Former unincorporated community in Virginia, United States

Coordinates: 37°7.101′N 80°33.193′W

Lovely Mount is an extinct unincorporated community in Radford, Virginia. Before 1854, and the arrival of the Virginia and Tennessee Railroad, Lovely Mount had a population of 30, but grew to more than 100 within 2 years. By 1890 the town had grown to more than 3000 and was eventually absorbed into the town of Radford in 1891.
