= Radford, Virginia =

Independent city in Virginia, United States

- Independent city
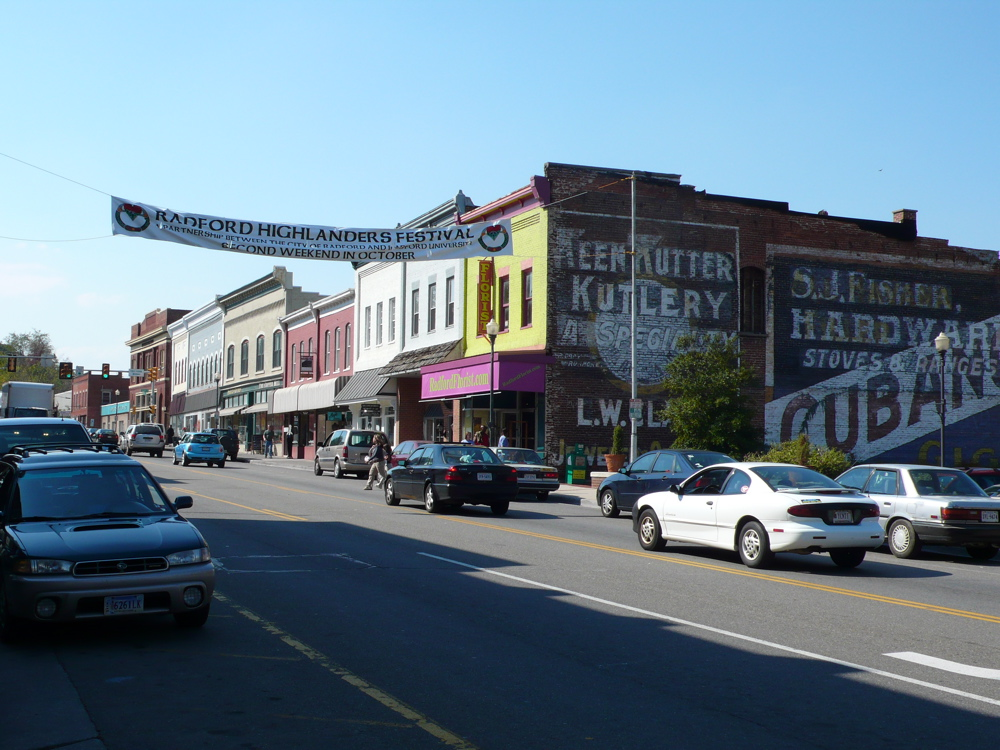
- Main Street in Radford, Virginia.

- Seal
- Nickname: The New River City
- Radford in Virginia

- Location within Shenandoah Valley Location within Virginia Location within the United States
- Coordinates: 37°7′39″N 80°34′10″W
- Country: United States
- State: Virginia
- Founded: 1887
- Named for: John B. Radford

Government
  - Mayor: David Horton

Area
  - Total: 10.01 sq mi (25.92 km^{2})
  - Land: 9.68 sq mi (25.06 km^{2})
  - Water: 0.33 sq mi (0.86 km^{2})
- Elevation: 2,103 ft (641 m)

Population (2020)
  - Total: 16,070
  - Estimate (2025): 17,243 ▲
  - Density: 1,661/sq mi (641.3/km^{2})
- Time zone: UTC−5 (EST)
  - Summer (DST): UTC−4 (EDT)
- ZIP codes: 24141–24143
- Area code: 540
- FIPS code: 51-65392
- GNIS feature ID: 1500073
- Website: radfordva.gov

Radford (formerly Lovely Mount, Central City, English Ferry and Ingle's Ferry) is an independent city in the U.S. state of Virginia. As of the 2020 census, the population was 16,070. For statistical purposes, the Bureau of Economic Analysis combines the city of Radford with neighboring Montgomery County.

Radford is included in the Blacksburg–Christiansburg metropolitan area.

Radford is the home of Radford University. Despite its name, the Radford Arsenal, historically a major employer of city residents, is in neighboring Pulaski and Montgomery Counties. Radford City has four schools: McHarg Elementary, Belle Heth Elementary, Dalton Intermediate, and Radford High School.

== History ==
Radford was named for John Blair Radford. His home, Arnheim, was listed on the National Register of Historic Places in 2002. Radford was originally a small village near the New River, which was a major draw to travelers for fresh water and food while traveling west. The town's population grew rapidly after 1854, when the Virginia and Tennessee Railroad was built nearby. A large depot was placed at Lovely Mount because of its strategic location between the eastern and western parts of the state. The actual station was not on Lovely Mountain, on the southwestern side of town, but Lovely Mount was a known mountain and naming the station after it helped people remember the depot's location. The Railroad Depot caused the population of Radford to boom. It also caused a major increase in trade and business in the area. Radford became a railroad town. Radford's original name was Lovely Mount because of the depot; the name was changed in 1891. Radford, or at least the train station area, was called Central Depot because of its location halfway between Lynchburg and Bristol, Virginia, on the Virginia and Tennessee Railroad (later the Norfolk and Western Railway). The names "Ingle's Ferry" or "English Ferry" derived from Ingles Ferry over the New River, just west of the town.

From 1900 to 1930, many companies came to Radford, including an ice company, a creamery, milling companies, piping, and preserving plants. In 1913, Radford was selected to become home to Radford State Normal School, a women's college. The school became Radford College in 1924 and was renamed Radford University in 1979. The presence of a college brought the town even more attention, causing even more population growth. In 1940–1941 the US military decided to build a manufacturing plant for gunpowder and other ammunition. The Radford Army Ammunition Plant, or the "Arsenal", joined the railroad and Lynchburg Foundry as major employers, creating a huge influx in population. Housing for the Arsenal was built in specific neighborhoods that still exist: Monroe Terrace, Radford Village, and Sunset Village. Today these are Radford's main residential neighborhoods. The railroad ceased passenger service through Radford in 1971 as personal transportation moved to the fairly new interstate highway system and the airways, but the railroad route through Radford is still a major component of Norfolk Southern Railway's Roanoke to Bristol route.

The James Charlton Farm, Ingles Bottom Archeological Sites, and Ingles Ferry are listed on the National Register of Historic Places.

Although a majority of Radford voters supported Barack Obama, Hillary Clinton, and Joe Biden in the elections of 2008, 2012, 2016, and 2020, during the 2012 campaign the city was the site of the so-called Crumb and Get It bakery incident, in which a bakery owner declined to host a campaign event for then-Vice President Joe Biden, citing political differences. The incident sparked significant media coverage and a surge in business for the bakery.

=== Glencoe Museum ===
- Glencoe
- U.S. National Register of Historic Places
- Virginia Landmarks Register
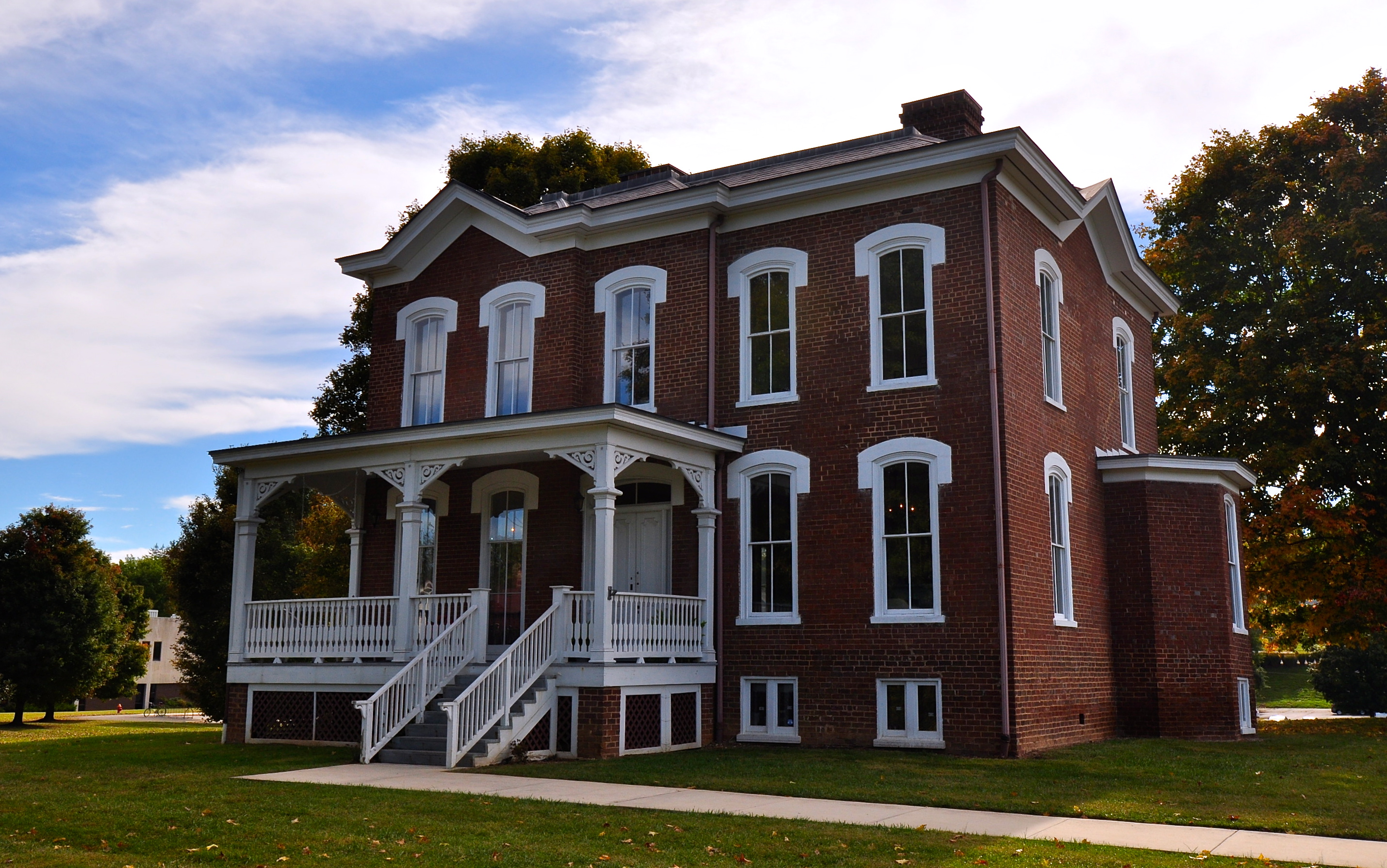
- Glencoe, October 2013

- Location within Virginia Location within the United States
- Location: First St., Radford, Virginia
- Area: 2.1 acres (0.85 ha)
- Built: 1875
- Architectural style: Second Empire
- NRHP reference No.: 00001439
- VLR No.: 126-0045

Significant dates
- Added to NRHP: November 22, 2000
- Designated VLR: September 15, 1999

Glencoe Museum is in downtown Radford, overlooking the New River. The house was built in 1870 in the Victorian style, specifically Second Empire, and serves as a home for many artifacts related to Radford's beginnings. It was the postbellum home of Confederate Brigadier General Gabriel C. Wharton. It is a large, two-story, five-bay, brick dwelling, and originally had quite extensive grounds. The original house had a barn, chicken coop, smokehouse, and an ice house. The name Glencoe is thought to be inspired by Anne Wharton's ancestry. Her family was originally from Scotland. The house did not appear in Radford's tax records until 1876. It took a long time to build a house of its size and grandeur in the 1800s. The house was kept in the family till 1996, when, after being deserted for 30 years, it was given to the city of Radford.

The house and grounds were donated by the Kollmorgen Motion Technology Group. The house was converted into a museum to show pieces of Radford's history. Native American artifacts demonstrate the New River's importance to the Native American culture and way of life. Original blueprints for the city and pictures of Radford from the past are on display. There is a Local Sports History exhibit and an exhibit on how the river affected life in Radford. The New River Exhibit includes information on ferries, steamboats, and other modes of river transportation. Glencoe Museum is a popular attraction for school field trips and visitors. It was listed on the National Register of Historic Places in 2000.

== Local attractions ==
Radford has five parks: Bisset Park, Wildwood Park, Riverview Park, Sunset Park, and Sisson Park. Radford also has the historic antebellum period Glencoe Museum, a local farmer's market and one movie theater.

Sunset Park is in the center of the west end of Radford. Riverview is on along the New River in the west end of Radford, used mainly for rec league practices. Wildwood Park is a wildlife and plant reserve for the city. Sisson Park, like Sunset Park, is in the center of the west end of Radford. Sisson Park also accommodates Joe Hodge Field, a baseball and softball field used for Little League.

=== Bisset Park ===
Bisset Park is the largest of the four parks. On the New River, it stretches 57 acres (23 ha). Bisset Park was named for David Bisset, a major contributor and overseer of parks and recreation in Radford. It is in the center of town across from Wildwood Park. It features three picnic shelters, a gazebo, tennis courts, and open fields mainly used for Little League soccer. The Riverway Trail is a 3.5-mile paved biking and walking path that can be accessed from Bisset Park. From there the trail extends east along the New River and south into Wildwood Park. A Civil War Trails marker is at the park's westernmost end, where the foundation of a bridge burned down during the Battle of New River Bridge.

=== Wildwood Park ===
Wildwood Park is a 50-acre wooded ravine in the center of town, with a paved bikeway along a stream at the bottom of two forested hillsides crisscrossed by hiking trails. It became the city's first public park in 1929, and was narrowly rescued from a highway-bypass plan in 1998 with the formation of a "Pathways for Radford" group seeking city support, leading to a development plan. The park falls along the original boundary between the former towns of East Radford, home of Radford University, and the traditionally more industrial West Radford. The towns were joined with the bridging of Connelly's Run by the city's East and West Main Street. The park's bikeway extends through a culvert tunnel beneath Main Street, connecting to Bisset Park along the New River. Wildwood Park includes a public restroom and a roofed pavilion with meeting or picnic tables. The park is used by Radford University and Radford High School for biology classes as well as summer nature lectures for the public. Students perform animal, plant, and stream tests, tree population counts, clean stream testing (for federal use), and observation of wildlife, Monarch butterflies, and spring wildflowers. The variety of flowers is especially attractive to visitors. Wildlife include many native birds as well as deer, raccoons, opossums, skunks, and groundhogs.

The western slope includes Adams Cave, a limestone cave used for saltpeter during the Civil War; the cave entrance is gated and locked.

A shallow stream, Connelly's Run, flows through the park and provides crayfish hunting for children in the summer. A culvert carries its waters under Main Street to the New River in Bisset Park. Connelly's Run fed a city swimming pool for 45 years but was closed and filled in when faced with the prospect of racial integration in 1965.

== Geography ==
Radford is located at 37°7′39″N 80°34′10″W (37.127585, −80.569523).

According to the United States Census Bureau, the city has an area of 10.2 square miles (26.4 km^{2}), of which 9.9 square miles (25.6 km^{2}) is land and 0.3 square miles (0.8 km^{2}) (3.3%) is water. The New River runs along the city's southwestern, western, and northern edges.

=== Weather and climate history ===
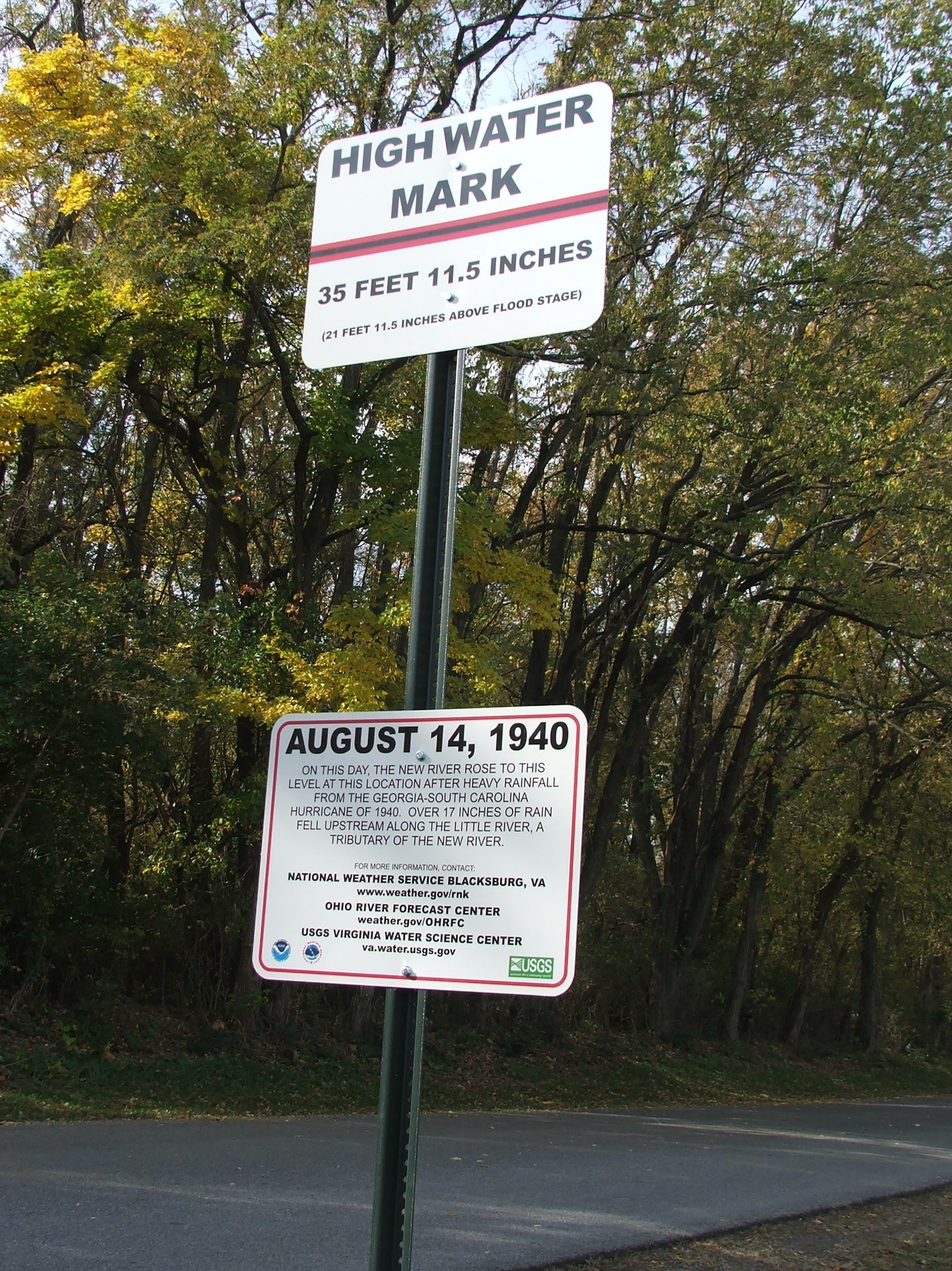
High-water mark sign in Bisset Park marking the height of the 1940 flood.

The worst river flooding in Radford's recorded history occurred on August 14, 1940, with a slow-moving tropical depression. The 1940 hurricane season produced eight storms, four of which were hurricanes. Around August 5 of that year, a tropical storm was detected along the northern Leeward Islands in the West Indies. The storm brought wind gusts of 44 mph to San Juan, Puerto Rico, as it moved northwestward. By August 6 it began a turn to the north while producing rough seas in the southeastern Bahamas. Four days later on August 10 the S.S. Maine off the southeast coast measured hurricane-force winds and the storm began movement again toward the northwest. The storm made landfall as a category 1 hurricane on August 11 at approximately 4 PM near Beaufort, South Carolina (along the SC/GA border). Winds reached 73 mph in nearby Savannah, Georgia.

As the Georgia – South Carolina hurricane of 1940 moved inland, record rainfall amounts were observed from South Carolina north through the Smoky Mountains and into southwest and central Virginia. The storm meandered along the Cumberland Plateau region as rain began falling in Virginia on August 13. The mountainous terrain coupled with extremely slow movement from the now tropical depression produced tremendous amounts of rain. Copper Hill in Floyd County, Virginia, received the highest rainfall in the state: 17.03 inches.

The United States Geological Survey (USGS) stream gauge across the New River (Kanawha River) from Bisset Park measured an all-time record height of 35 feet 11.5 inches which is nearly 22 feet above what is considered flood stage. Residents in low-lying areas were forced to evacuate their homes and both the former Burlington Mills and the Lynchburg Foundry manufacturing plants were shut down because of high water. The road leading from Radford into Pulaski County towards Claytor Lake Dam was inundated and impassable. Thankfully, no deaths were reported across southwest Virginia, but several million dollars' worth of damage occurred (1940 USD).

On October 18, 2011, a sign recognizing the historic flooding was dedicated in Bisset Park near downtown Radford. The sign was donated by local resident Anthony Phillips, a hydrometeorologist from Snowville, Virginia, and installation was sponsored by the National Weather Service and the United States Geological Survey through the High Water Mark (HWM) Project. The project helps raise awareness of flood risk by installing high-water mark signs in prominent locations within communities that have experienced severe flooding.

=== Adjacent counties ===
- Pulaski County, Virginia – west
- Montgomery County, Virginia – east

== Demographics ==
Historical population
Census	Pop.	Note	%±
1890	2,060		—
1900	3,344		62.3%
1910	4,202		25.7%
1920	4,627		10.1%
1930	6,227		34.6%
1940	6,990		12.3%
1950	9,026		29.1%
1960	9,371		3.8%
1970	11,596		23.7%
1980	13,225		14.0%
1990	15,940		20.5%
2000	15,859		−0.5%
2010	16,408		3.5%
2020	16,070		−2.1%
2025 (est.)	17,243	▲	7.3%
U.S. Decennial Census; 1790–1960 1900–1990; 1990–2000 2010 2020

=== Racial and ethnic composition ===
Radford city, Virginia – Racial and ethnic composition Note: the US Census treats Hispanic/Latino as an ethnic category. This table excludes Latinos from the racial categories and assigns them to a separate category. Hispanics/Latinos may be of any race.
Race / Ethnicity (NH = Non-Hispanic)	Pop 1980	Pop 1990	Pop 2000	Pop 2010	Pop 2020	% 1980	% 1990	% 2000	% 2010	% 2020
White alone (NH)	12,171	14,521	13,900	14,075	12,006	92.03%	91.10%	87.65%	85.78%	74.71%
Black or African American alone (NH)	859	952	1,274	1,262	2,125	6.50%	5.97%	8.03%	7.69%	13.22%
Native American or Alaska Native alone (NH)	10	15	36	30	30	0.08%	0.09%	0.23%	0.18%	0.19%
Asian alone (NH)	58	269	223	251	210	0.44%	1.69%	1.41%	1.53%	1.31%
Native Hawaiian or Pacific Islander alone (NH)	x	x	4	5	0	x	x	0.03%	0.03%	0.00%
Other race alone (NH)	35	8	23	23	269	0.26%	0.05%	0.15%	0.14%	1.67%
Mixed race or Multiracial (NH)	x	x	215	377	665	x	x	1.36%	2.30%	4.14%
Hispanic or Latino (any race)	92	175	184	385	765	0.70%	1.10%	1.16%	2.35%	4.76%
Total	13,225	15,940	15,859	16,408	16,070	100.00%	100.00%	100.00%	100.00%	100.00%

=== 2020 census ===
As of the 2020 census, Radford had a population of 16,070. The median age was 23.5 years. 13.9% of residents were under the age of 18 and 10.8% of residents were 65 years of age or older. For every 100 females there were 85.8 males, and for every 100 females age 18 and over there were 83.5 males age 18 and over.

95.8% of residents lived in urban areas, while 4.2% lived in rural areas.

There were 5,789 households in Radford, of which 22.5% had children under the age of 18 living in them. Of all households, 29.9% were married-couple households, 26.8% were households with a male householder and no spouse or partner present, and 34.8% were households with a female householder and no spouse or partner present. About 36.5% of all households were made up of individuals and 9.3% had someone living alone who was 65 years of age or older.

There were 6,449 housing units, of which 10.2% were vacant. The homeowner vacancy rate was 1.6% and the rental vacancy rate was 8.6%.

Racial composition as of the 2020 census
Race	Number	Percent
White	12,280	76.4%
Black or African American	2,182	13.6%
American Indian and Alaska Native	40	0.2%
Asian	217	1.4%
Native Hawaiian and Other Pacific Islander	6	0.0%
Some other race	488	3.0%
Two or more races	857	5.3%
Hispanic or Latino (of any race)	765	4.8%

=== 2000 census ===
As of the census of 2000, there were 15,859 people, 5,809 households, and 2,643 families residing in the city. The population density was 1,615.2 people per square mile (623.6 people/km^{2}). There were 6,137 housing units at an average density of 625.0 units per square mile (241.3 units/km^{2}). The racial makeup of the city was 88.21% White, 8.10% African American, 0.25% Native American, 1.43% Asian, 0.03% Pacific Islander, 0.49% from other races, and 1.51% from two or more races. Hispanic or Latino of any race were 1.16% of the population.

There were 5,809 households, out of which 18.8% had children under the age of 18 living with them, 33.9% were married couples living together, 8.9% had a female householder with no husband present, and 54.5% were non-families. 32.0% of all households were made up of individuals, and 8.7% had someone living alone who was 65 years of age or older. The average household size was 2.25 and the average family size was 2.78.

The age distribution, which is strongly influenced by Radford University, is: 12.9% under the age of 18, 44.0% from 18 to 24, 19.6% from 25 to 44, 14.3% from 45 to 64, and 9.2% who were 65 years of age or older. The median age was 23 years. For every 100 females, there were 83.5 males. For every 100 females age 18 and over, there were 81.6 males.

The median income for a household in the city was $24,654, and the median income for a family was $46,332. Males had a median income of $33,045 versus $22,298 for females. The per capita income for the city was $14,289. About 6.9% of families and 31.4% of the population were below the poverty line, including 10.8% of those under age 18 and 9.4% of those age 65 or over.

== Local sports accomplishments ==
- From 1946 to 1950, Radford hosted its first and only Professional Baseball team, The Radford Rockets, who played as members of the Blue Ridge League.
- John Dobbins was the 1st Black Football player for Virginia Tech.
- Radford High School has won 36 VHSL State Titles.
- Radford's 1971 and 1972 high school football teams were undefeated and won over 26 straight games. The Bobcats won the AA state title 2 years in a row and they were considered one of the top high school football teams in the nation in the early 1970s.
- Virginia Tech Head Football Coach Frank Beamer was an assistant coach for the 1971 AA State Championship Radford Bobcats Football Team.
- Norman G. Lineburg is legendary in Virginia for coaching the Radford Bobcats from 1970 to 2006. He retired from coaching football after the 2006 season with 315 wins. Lineburg has the second most wins in VHSL football history behind legendary Hampton coach Mike Smith.
- Former Radford High School standout Darris Nichols was a basketball player for the West Virginia Mountaineers. Nichols is famous in Mountaineer-lore for hitting the game-winning three-point shot that sent the Mountaineers to the NIT Championship game in 2007. He also holds the school record for the most career games played and most tournament games played all-time, tied for the school record for the most all-time postseason tournament games played, and the NCAA record for playing 141 games without fouling out.

Radford High School Athletic State Titles: 2022 Class A Boys' Outdoor Track and Field, 2017 Class 2A Boys Swimming 2013 Class A Boys' Outdoor Track and Field, 2013 Class A Boys' Basketball, 2012 Class A Boys' Cross Country, 2011 Class A Boys' Basketball, 2011 Class A Girls' Basketball, 2009 Class A Boys' Basketball, 2008 Class A Boys' Soccer, 2007 Class A Girls' Soccer, 2007 Class A Boys' Soccer, 2007 Class A Boys' Cross Country, 2005 Class A Girls' Basketball, 2002 Class A Girls' Tennis, 2001 Class A Girls' Tennis, 2000 Class A Girls' Tennis, 1999 Class A Girls' Tennis, 1998 Class A Wrestling, 1998 Class A Girls' Tennis, 1998 Class A Boys' Tennis, 1998 Class A Boys' Track, 1990 Class AA Girls' Track, 1989 Class AA Girls' Track, 1988 Class AA Girls' Basketball, 1988 Class AA Girls' Tennis, 1985 Class AA Girls' Tennis, 1984 Class AA Girls' volleyball, 1984 Class AA Girls' Basketball, 1983 Class AA Girls' Basketball, 1972 Class AA Football, 1972 Class AA Boys' Outdoor Track, 1972 Class AA Boys' Indoor Track, 1971 Class AA Football, 1963 Class AA Boys' Tennis, 1949 Class AA Boys' Basketball.

== Climate ==
The climate in this area has mild differences between highs and lows, and there is adequate rainfall year-round. According to the Köppen Climate Classification system, Radford has a marine west coast climate, abbreviated "Cfb" on climate maps.

== Notable people ==
- Richard Harding Poff, US representative and senior justice of VA Supreme Court. Richard Nixon's choice for nomination to the supreme court, he withdrew his name before the nomination reached the senate.
- The Gregory Brothers, musicians, comedians
- John N. Dalton, former Virginia governor
- James Hoge Tyler, former Virginia governor
- Corinne Conley, actress and voice actress. Voiced Rudolph’s mother and Dolly for Sue in the Rankin/Bass holiday classic Rudolph the Red-Nosed Reindeer.
- James Clinton Turk, United States District Judge and minority leader of state senate
- Theodore Roosevelt Dalton, United States district judge and two-time Republican candidate for governor
- Glen E. Conrad, United States District Judge
- Scott Long, human rights activist
- Mike Williams, Major League Baseball relief pitcher
- John Ripley, United States Marine Corps colonel and recipient of the Navy Cross
- Kevin Hartman, Major League Soccer goalkeeper
- Margaret Skeete (1878–1994), oldest living American
- Paul Washer, Christian missionary and evangelist
- Seka (actress), actress, radio talk show host, and author
- Mike Young (basketball), Virginia Tech Hokies men's head basketball coach

== Politics ==
As reflected in the table below, Radford has leaned Democratic in presidential elections, but citizens have rarely given a candidate 60 percent of their vote. The last Republican to carry the city was George W. Bush in 2004, and Donald Trump only lost it by 34 votes in 2024.

United States presidential election results for Radford, Virginia
Year	Republican		Democratic		Third party(ies)	
Year	No.	%	No.	%	No.	%
1892	185	23.33%	591	74.53%	17	2.14%
1896	309	43.58%	372	52.47%	28	3.95%
1900	197	42.92%	257	55.99%	5	1.09%
1904	100	34.25%	184	63.01%	8	2.74%
1908	141	39.94%	204	57.79%	8	2.27%
1912	36	10.98%	185	56.40%	107	32.62%
1916	115	35.17%	206	63.00%	6	1.83%
1920	245	37.12%	402	60.91%	13	1.97%
1924	314	38.91%	394	48.82%	99	12.27%
1928	524	58.42%	373	41.58%	0	0.00%
1932	341	37.51%	542	59.63%	26	2.86%
1936	421	39.05%	650	60.30%	7	0.65%
1940	417	34.29%	793	65.21%	6	0.49%
1944	597	41.95%	824	57.91%	2	0.14%
1948	850	48.16%	826	46.80%	89	5.04%
1952	1,523	57.73%	1,108	42.00%	7	0.27%
1956	1,910	62.46%	1,118	36.56%	30	0.98%
1960	1,663	57.11%	1,240	42.58%	9	0.31%
1964	1,505	44.82%	1,850	55.09%	3	0.09%
1968	2,077	55.40%	1,206	32.17%	466	12.43%
1972	2,577	68.68%	1,121	29.88%	54	1.44%
1976	1,844	44.74%	2,240	54.34%	38	0.92%
1980	1,964	44.01%	2,225	49.85%	274	6.14%
1984	2,855	61.15%	1,781	38.15%	33	0.71%
1988	2,481	56.84%	1,855	42.50%	29	0.66%
1992	1,996	41.71%	2,183	45.62%	606	12.66%
1996	1,742	40.67%	2,113	49.33%	428	9.99%
2000	2,190	49.24%	2,063	46.38%	195	4.38%
2004	2,564	52.92%	2,244	46.32%	37	0.76%
2008	2,418	44.54%	2,930	53.97%	81	1.49%
2012	2,520	46.68%	2,732	50.60%	147	2.72%
2016	2,638	43.35%	2,925	48.07%	522	8.58%
2020	2,786	44.08%	3,358	53.13%	176	2.78%
2024	3,197	48.56%	3,231	49.08%	155	2.35%

== See also ==
- National Register of Historic Places in Radford, Virginia
