= Explore Park =

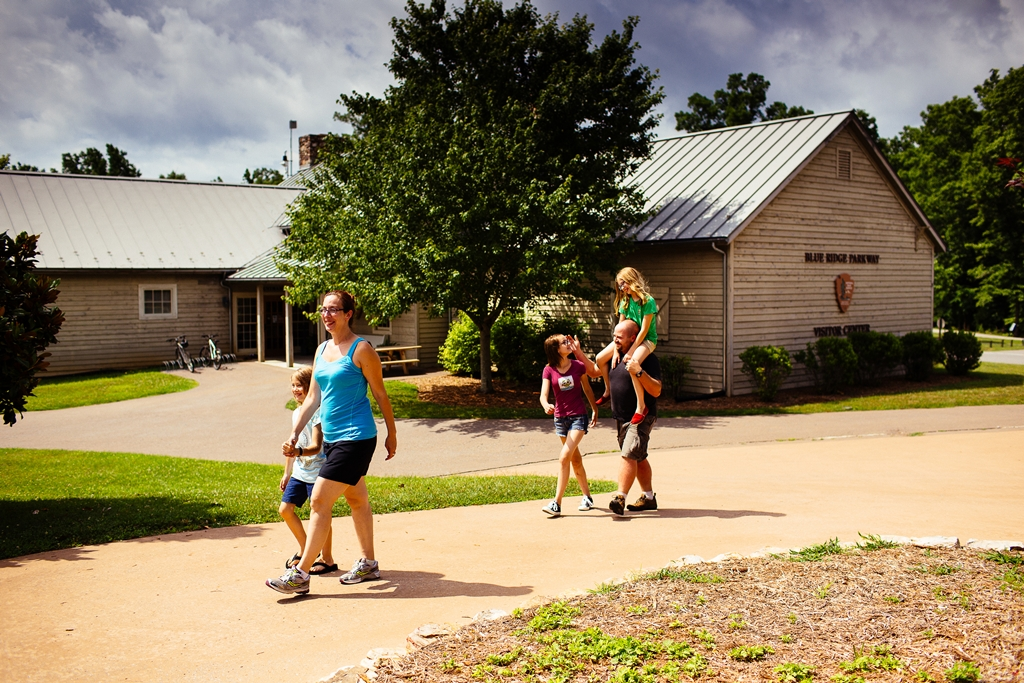
- Blue Ridge Parkway Visitor Center at Explore Park

- Location within Virginia
- Nearest city: Roanoke, Virginia
- Coordinates: 37°14′17.8″N 79°51′7″W
- Area: 1,100 acres (450 ha)
- Created: 1985
- Operator: Roanoke County, Department of Parks, Recreation and Tourism
- Visitors: 18,000 (2014)
- Open: July 2, 1994
- Website: explorepark.org

Explore Park is a 1,100-acre (450 ha) passive recreation facility operated by the Roanoke County Department of Parks, Recreation and Tourism. The park is located at milepost 115 on the Blue Ridge Parkway in Roanoke County, Virginia, with 700 acres (280 ha) of the park lying in Roanoke County and 400 acres (160 ha) in adjacent Bedford County. It includes various restored local historical structures and both hiking and biking trails, along with access to the Roanoke River for recreational use via an external county road. The park is located near the gorge where the Roanoke River leaves the Roanoke Valley.

== History ==
The River Foundation was formed by Roanoke Valley-area community and business leaders to create a recreational attraction as a hub for tourism in western Virginia. The Virginia General Assembly created the Virginia Recreational Facilities Authority (VRFA) in 1986 to further these ends, and VRFA worked in partnership with the River Foundation. The initial aim was to draw visitors driving on the Blue Ridge Parkway to the Roanoke area. The VRFA acquired the land in 1988 with a US$6,000,000 (equivalent to $16,330,000 in 2025) appropriation from the General Assembly and the site became a Virginia state park. Explore Park has received considerable investment at the federal, state and local levels totaling nearly US$52,000,000 (equivalent to $77,760,000 in 2025) by 2008.

Early ideas included an expanded Mill Mountain Zoo and a historical theme park that would educate visitors on the journey of Lewis and Clark through the American frontier. Roanoke's then city manager Bern Ewart left his post to oversee the park's development. A lack of investment funds led the park to become a more modest living history museum focused on the early history of Southwest Virginia. Today's Explore Park began to emerge on September 10, 1991 when reconstruction began on the 1837 Hofauger House of Roanoke County. The River Foundation transferred operating authority to VRFA on July 1, 1994 and Explore Park opened to the public one day later, on July 2, 1994. Between 1991 and 2002 various other historical structures including a working tavern and grist mill were added to the property.

After the plans for Disney's America were unveiled in September 1993, some officials from Explore Park noted striking similarities in proposed themes and rides.

=== Planned partnership with Virginia Living Histories ===
Explore Park's Totero Village

On July 24, 2001 Roanoke County made a five-year financial commitment to the park when the State of Virginia eliminated the park's annual appropriation, starting in 2002. Four years later, in June 2005, Virginia Living Histories (VLH) approached VRFA with a plan to develop Explore Park into a major tourist destination. VLH was headed by Larry Vander Maten, a Florida-based developer. Vander Maten hired a team of three consultants, including a former Disney executive, who toured the park in July 2005 to come up with ideas. The trio left after the tour, lunch at a fried pickle restaurant, and meetings with local officials with promises to keep the concepts close to the 1987 master plan. The agreement between VRFA and VLH was for a three-year lease option agreement, with up to two one-year extensions, allowing VLH to conduct studies and come up with a final proposal prior to VLH committing to development and investment of a minimum of US$90,000,000 (equivalent to $148,360,000 in 2025) in the first three years of a 99-year lease. VLH estimated its total investment would be closer to US$200,000,000 (equivalent to $329,700,000 in 2025).

On October 16, 2007, the Roanoke Times reported that the park would not reopen for the 2008 season in April after the 2007 season ended on November 18. VRFA did not have adequate funding to operate Explore Park beyond the fiscal year ending June 30, 2008, so plans were made to shut down the park and preserve its historical artifacts at the end of the 2007 season instead. The last-day visitors expressed disappointment in the park's planned closure, with then-9-year-old William Cathey saying that he hoped "they are going to build something new that's pretty nice" but he suspected "it's never going to be as good as it is." At the time, it was thought that VLH would decide to proceed with its investment, and the anticipated impact to the public would be minimal, as VLH would have needed to shut down the park in any event starting in 2008 to commence construction. The park transitioned to a passive recreation facility on July 1, 2008, and the park's buildings were shuttered with the exception of the Blue Ridge Parkway Visitor Center. However, due to the global recession, there were no willing lenders and VLH would exercise its options for two one-year extensions to the review/study period, as capital to begin construction was not available, and VRFA began developing alternative plans.

Near the end of the first extension period, on April 28, 2009, Vander Maten revealed a plan to open a resort named "Blue Ridge America" featuring amenities which include an equestrian center, man-made lakes, retail shops, a golf course, conference center, spa, a system of overhead gondolas to transport visitors around the park, and what was billed as the "longest, highest zip line anywhere." Mr. Vander Maten was unable to raise the necessary funds, and the lease option was allowed to expire in June 2010.

=== Re-Opening and Adventure Plan ===
In October 2013, the park re-opened after being purchased by the Virginia Recreational Facilities Authority through a 99-year operating lease to the County of Roanoke. The facility is currently operated by the County's Parks, Recreation and Tourism department as a passive recreation facility. Under Roanoke County administration, annual visitors increased from 13,000 or fewer in 2012 and 2013 to more than 18,000 in 2014, the first full year under County management.

The County is currently seeking to develop the site as an outdoor adventure park with amenities such as cabins, RV parks and zip lines. Roanoke County hired the Philadelphia-based firm of Wallace Roberts & Todd in July 2015 after evaluating four bids to develop a master plan for the next twenty years of park development. Over the next five years, the County intends to embark on a US$3,000,000 (equivalent to $4,070,000 in 2025) capital improvement plan to bring utilities to the Park and improve park roads.

== Historical Area ==
The historical area within Explore Park is home to dozens of 18th- and 19th-century buildings relocated from their original locations and reconstructed on-site. Following the 2007 shutdown, the buildings are not normally publicly accessible, but the Mountain Union Church may be rented for special events, including weddings. Other buildings include:

- Mountain Union Church — opened April 19, 1998 following an investment of US$239,000 (equivalent to $472,000 in 2025); originally built in the early 1800s following a grant of 1 acre (0.40 ha) of land by George Etzler at the juncture of old Blacksburg Road and Catawba Road in the Haymakertown area of Botetourt County.
- Brugh Tavern — opened April 28, 1998 following an investment of US$1,400,000 (equivalent to $2,765,000 in 2025) as a restaurant with historical ambience; originally located near the Great Wagon Road in Botetourt County.
- Roanoke Explorer Batteau — opened August 24, 1999 following an investment of US$75,000 (equivalent to $145,000 in 2025); offering batteau rides to illustrate the flow of commerce prior to the rise of the railroads in the mid-19th century and a common entrepreneurship opportunity for freed slaves.

Totero Village

- Totero Village — opened June 22, 2002 following an investment of US$35,000 (equivalent to $63,000 in 2025); containing four houses (enlarged to seven in 2005), work shelters, a hide-tanning area, and a garden patterned after a Native American village from the late 17th century.
- Slone's Grist Mill — opened September 20, 2002 following an investment of US$330,000 (equivalent to $591,000 in 2025); originally built 1880–1890 in the Turner's Creek section of Franklin County on the Pigg River.
- Frontier Fort — opened in 2004 following an investment of US$5,000 (equivalent to $9,000 in 2025) using logs harvested from the Explore Park property; patterned after a refuge built by Ephraim Vause, Fort Vause, that was built near the present town of Shawsville along the Roanoke River. Demolished in 2023.
- Blacksmith Shop — patterned after historical smithies on the Great Wagon Road
- Hofauger House — originally built in 1837 at the intersection of Ogden Road and Colonial Avenue in Roanoke County. Repurposed in 2025 as a discovery center.
- Houtz Barn — a German double-crib bank barn originally located on a farm on Mason's Creek near present-day Salem.
- Kemp's Ford School House — a single-room schoolhouse originally located near a ford of the Blackwater River in Franklin County.
- Leninger Cabin — originally built in 2010 for the filming of the movie Alone yet Not Alone and patterned on a log cabin from the 1750s.

=== Other buildings and structures ===
Other park features built to accommodate visitors include:

- Arthur Taubman Welcome Center — opened on May 6, 1998 following an investment of US$845,000 (equivalent to $1,669,000 in 2025) to serve as the park's gateway.
- Blue Ridge Parkway Visitor Center — opened on May 7, 2001 following an investment of US$1,300,000 (equivalent to $2,364,000 in 2025) to educate visitors about the Blue Ridge Parkway. It is the only building which remained open after 2007.
- Salem Turnpike — opened May 17, 2002 following an investment of US$75,000 (equivalent to $134,000 in 2025) which is a 1.8-mile (2.9 km) perimeter road around the Historical Area underwritten by the city of Salem.

== In popular culture ==
The movie Alone yet Not Alone (2014) was filmed at Explore Park in 2010. The film documents the true historical account of the Leininger sisters, settlers in Pennsylvania who were captured by Delaware Indians following the Penn's Creek massacre on October 16, 1755.
