= Attack on German Flatts =

Attack on German Flatts may refer to one of two raids on the settlement of German Flatts, New York that is now called Herkimer owing to an 18th-century surveying error (and is not to be confused with present-day German Flatts, which was then called Herkimer):

- Attack on German Flatts (1757) was a raid by French and Indians during the Seven Years' War
- Attack on German Flatts (1778) was a raid by Indians and Loyalists during the American Revolutionary War
