= Walnut Grove Farm (Shawsville, Virginia) =

Historic farm in Virginia, US

- U.S. National Register of Historic Places
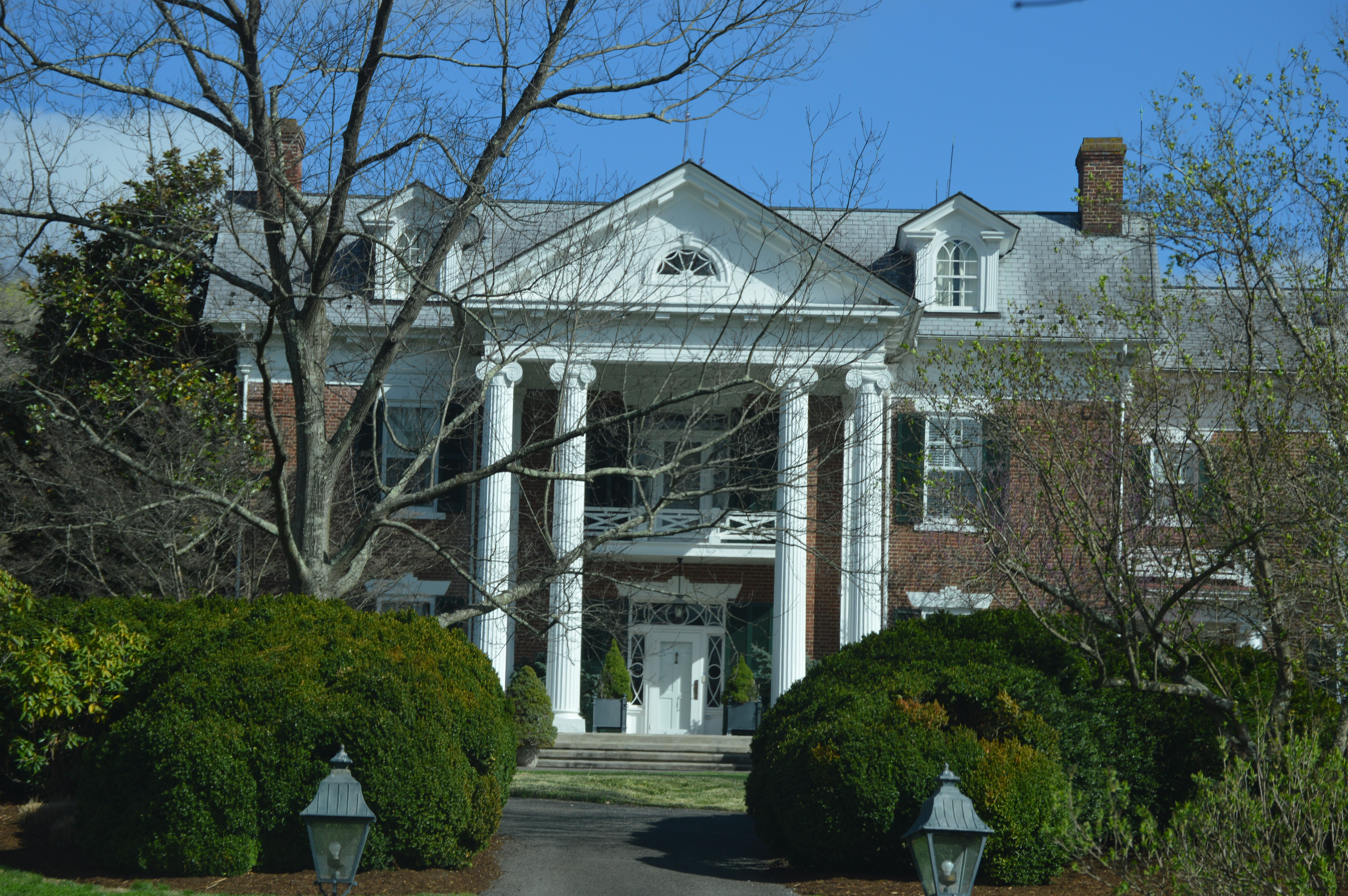

- Location within Virginia Location within the United States
- Location: Boners Run Rd., 0.2 miles (0.32 km) southeast of U.S. Routes 11/U.S. Route 460, Shawsville, Virginia
- Coordinates: 37°10′6″N 80°14′49″W
- Area: 330 acres (130 ha)
- Built: 1910
- Architectural style: Colonial Revival, Center-passage plan
- MPS: Montgomery County MPS
- NRHP reference No.: 89001899
- Added to NRHP: January 17, 1991

Maple Grove Farm is a historic farm property on Boners Run Road in Shawsville, Virginia. The farm complex includes an early 20th-century Colonial Revival farmhouse and a number of outbuildings, including a small log house that dates to the early period of the property's agricultural use. The property also includes a small mill complex. The land was part of a large tract given to Ephraim Vause in 1748, and developed later in the 18th century by the Madison family. The property was used for dairy and cattle production for most of the 20th century.

The farm was listed on the "National Register of Historic Places "in 1991.

== See also ==
- National Register of Historic Places listings in Montgomery County, Virginia
