= Rife House (Shawsville, Virginia) =

Historic house in Virginia, United States

- U.S. National Register of Historic Places
- Virginia Landmarks Register
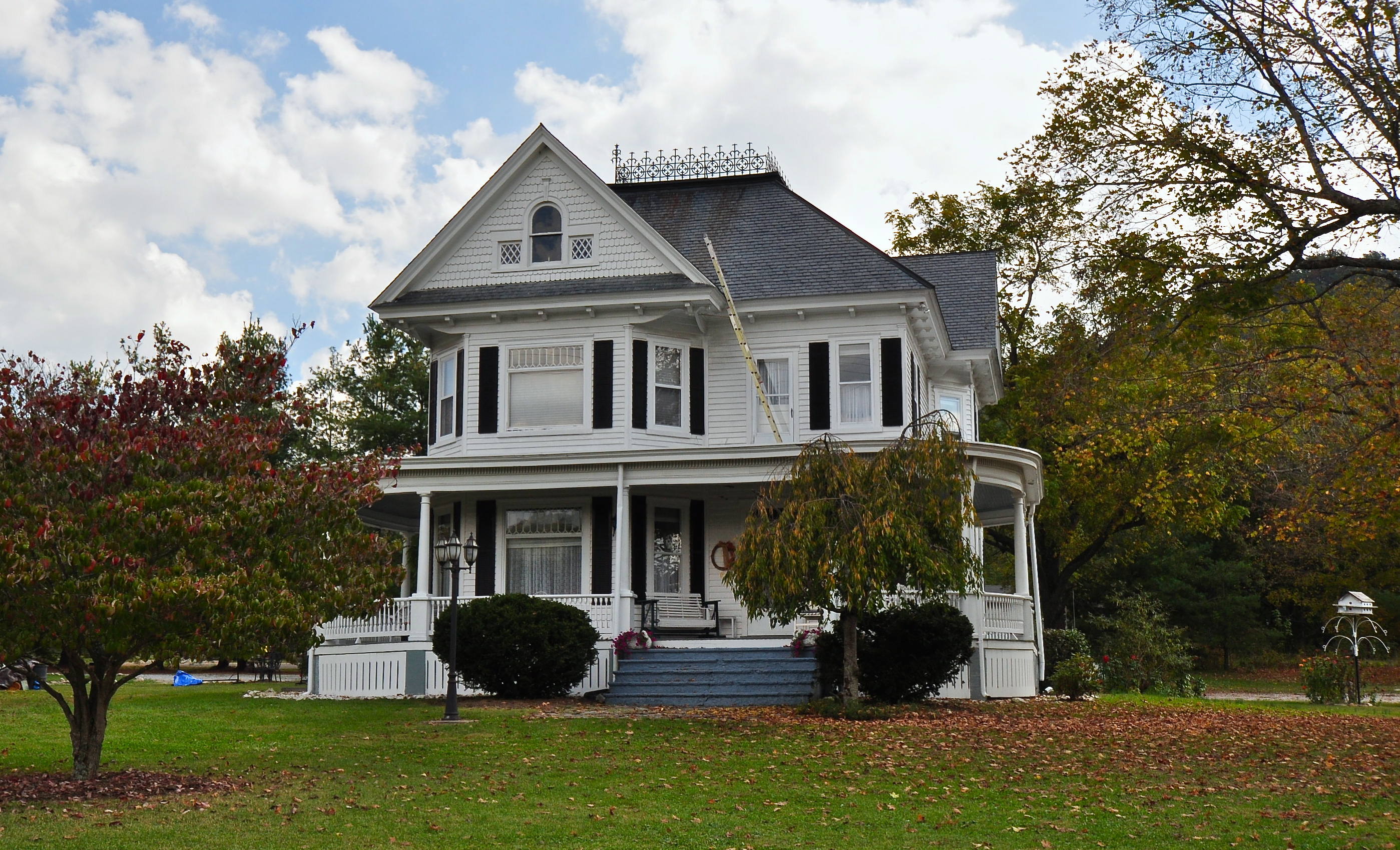
- Rife House, October 2013

- Location within Virginia Location within the United States
- Location: VA 612 at VA 615, Shawsville, Virginia
- Coordinates: 37°10′38″N 80°14′13″W
- Area: 1.5 acres (0.61 ha)
- Built: 1905
- Architectural style: Queen Anne
- MPS: Montgomery County MPS
- NRHP reference No.: 89001900
- VLR No.: 060-0443

Significant dates
- Added to NRHP: November 13, 1989
- Designated VLR: June 20, 1989

Rife House is a historic home located at Shawsville, Montgomery County, Virginia. It was built in 1905, and is a two-story, rectangular Queen Anne style frame dwelling with a flat-topped hipped roof with cast iron ornamental cresting. It features a one-story, curved, wraparound porch with Doric order columns on pedestals and equipped with a turned balustrade. Also on the property is a contributing frame outbuilding.

It was listed on the National Register of Historic Places in 1989.
