= Shawsville Historic District =

Historic district in Virginia, United States

- U.S. National Register of Historic Places
- U.S. Historic district
- Virginia Landmarks Register
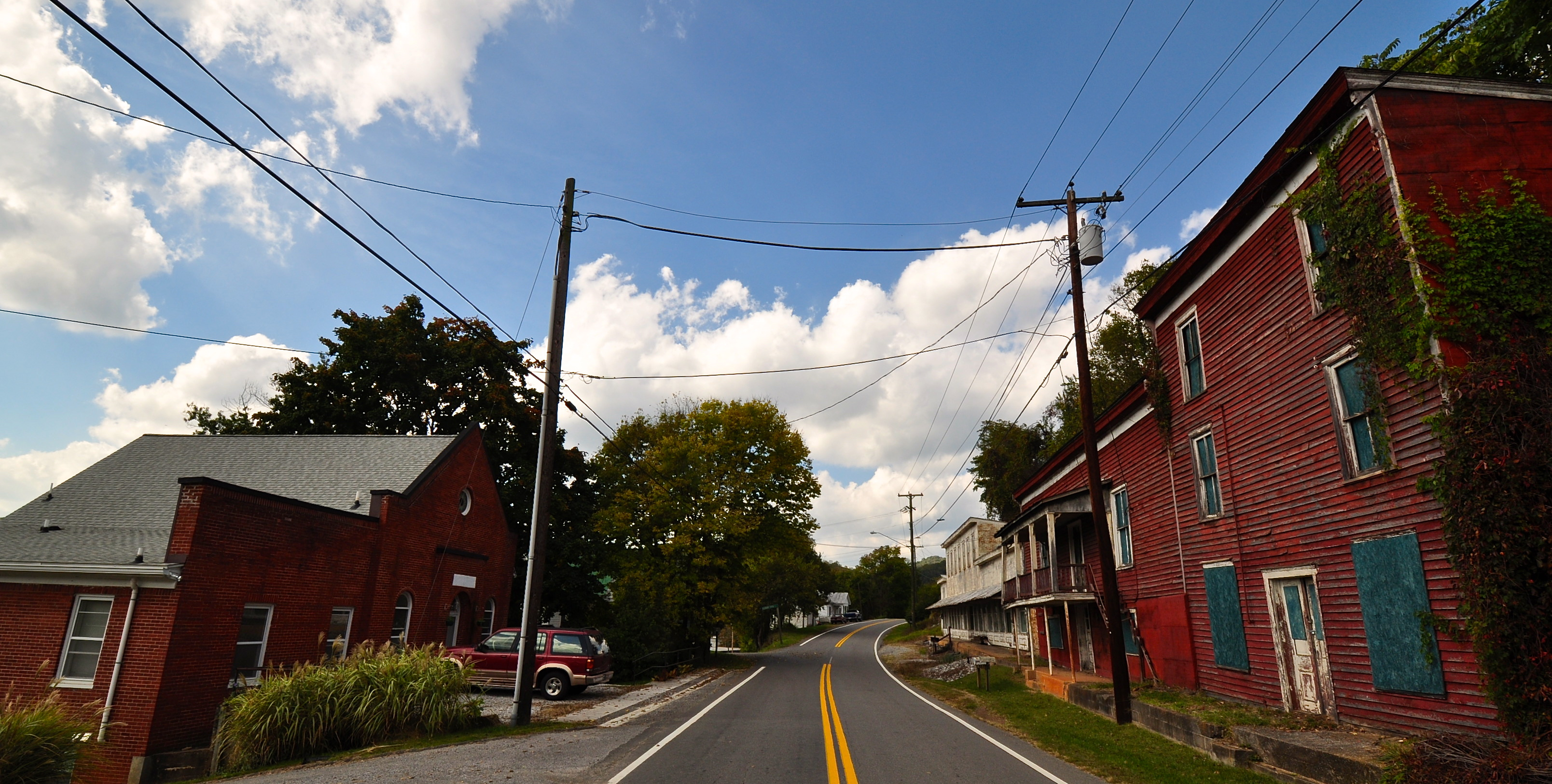
- Shawsville Historic District, October 2013

- Location within Virginia Location within the United States
- Location: Main St. E and W of jct. with VA 637, Shawsville, Virginia
- Coordinates: 37°10′8″N 80°15′17″W
- Area: 7 acres (2.8 ha)
- Architect: Miller, Homer W.
- Architectural style: Colonial Revival, Center-passage plan
- MPS: Montgomery County MPS
- NRHP reference No.: 90002009
- VLR No.: 060-0456

Significant dates
- Added to NRHP: January 10, 1991
- Designated VLR: June 20, 1989

Shawsville Historic District is a national historic district located at Shawsville, Montgomery County, Virginia. The district encompasses 13 contributing buildings in the central business district of Shawsville. It consists principally of a group of late-19th and early-20th century frame and brick commercial buildings with dwellings located at the outer boundaries. Notable buildings include the Bank of Shawsville (1910), W.W. Lykens Furniture Store (c. 1905), White Memorial Church (c. 1935), and the Showalter House.

It was listed on the National Register of Historic Places in 1991.
