= Belletre =

Belletre may refer to:

- Beletre, officer
- Belletrism (from Fr. "Belles-Lettres" writing style, poetry)
