= Hamner House =

Hamner House may refer to:

- Hamner House (Bon Secour, Alabama), listed on the National Register of Historic Places in Baldwin County, Alabama
- Hamner House (Schuyler, Virginia), nominated for listing on the National Register of Historic Places in Nelson County, Virginia
