= Virginia Landmarks Register =

Historic properties in Virginia, US

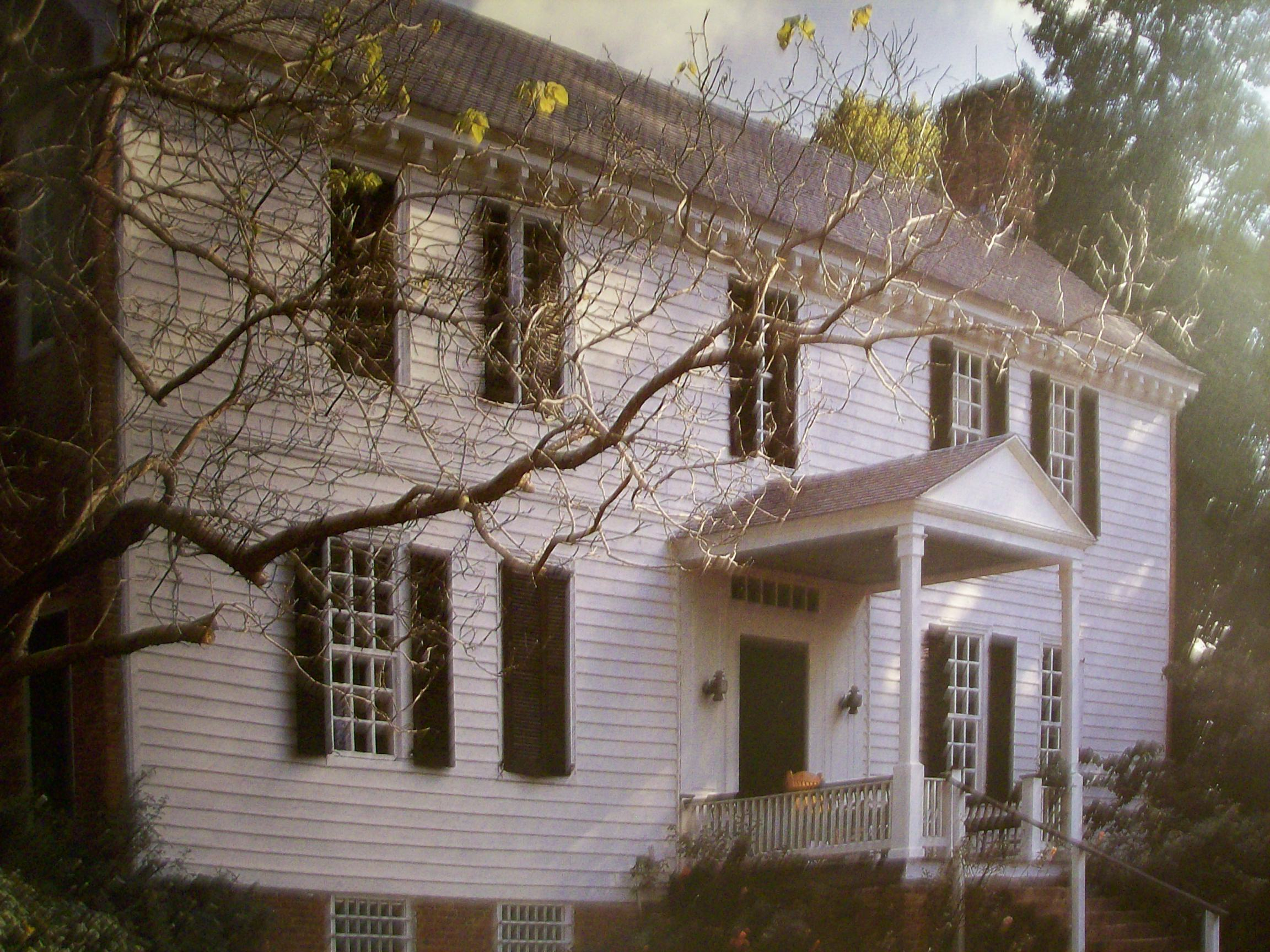
The Tuckahoe Plantation in Goochland County was the first property to be listed on the Virginia Landmarks Register in 1968.

The Virginia Landmarks Register (VLR) is a list of historic properties in the Commonwealth of Virginia. The state's official list of important historic sites, it was created in 1965, by the General Assembly in the Code of Virginia. The Register serves the same purpose as the National Register of Historic Places. The nomination form for any Virginia site listed on the VLR is sent forward to the National Park Service for consideration for listing on the National Register.

The Virginia Landmarks Register is maintained by the Virginia Department of Historic Resources.

== List of Virginia Landmarks ==
Almost all of the over 2800 sites listed on the national register are also listed on the state register. For those listings see: National Register of Historic Places listings in Virginia.

Virginia register only

The following are listed on the Virginia register, but not the national register:

Name	Image	Location	County	File #	Description
Australia Furnace			Alleghany	003-0098	
Barcroft Apartments			Arlington County, Virginia	000-9419	
Buck Mountain Church		Earlysville	Albemarle	002-0145	
Cactus Hill Archaeological Site			Sussex	091-5026	
Camp A.A Humphreys Pump Station and Filter Building		Fort Belvoir	Fairfax	029-0096	
Capitol Landing (Queen Mary's Port)			Williamsburg (city)	137-0056	
Catawba Furnace			Botetourt	011-0040	
Cedar Creek Meetinghouse Archaeological Site			Hanover	042-0121	
Davis and Kimpton Brickyard			Newport News (city)	121-0018	
Elizabeth Furnace		Shenandoah Valley	Shenandoah	085-0940	
Fort Belvoir Historic District			Fairfax	029-0209	
Fort Vause Site		Shawsville	Montgomery	060-0017	
Garrett Woods Complex #1			Mecklenburg	058-5001	
Garrett Woods Complex #2			Mecklenburg	058-5002	
Garrett Woods Complex #3			Mecklenburg	058-5003	
Glebe House			Mecklenburg	058-5008	
Glenwood Furnace			Rockbridge	081-0104	
Hamner House			Nelson	062-0282	
Ivy Hill Plantation			Mecklenburg	058-0088	
James River and Kanawha Canal Sites			Lynchburg (city)	118-0209	
Lexington Site			Fairfax	029-5612	
Liberty Baptist Church (Caroline County, Virginia)			Caroline	016-0069	Rappahannock Academy
Little River Turnpike Bridge			Loudoun	053-0244	
Lock Lane Apartments			Richmond (city)	127-6170	
Manassas Gap Railroad Independent Line			Fairfax	029-5013	
Marlborough Point Site			Stafford	089-0001	
Miley Archaeological Site			Shenandoah	085-0101	
Millenbeck Sites			Lancaster	051-0029	
Mount Pleasant			Surry	090-0015	(Architectural and Archaeological Complex)
Newcastle Town Site			Hanover	042-0101	
Newman Point			Mecklenburg	058-5007	
Occoneechee Plantation			Mecklenburg	058-0091	
Pantops Farm		Charlottesville	Albemarle	002-0130	
Preston House			Montgomery	060-0270	
Quicksburg Archaeological Site			Shenandoah	085-0102	
Raven Cliff Furnace			Wythe	098-0214	
Rifes Mill			Rockingham	082-0284	
Rudd Branch Ridge - Complexes 3 & 4			Mecklenburg	058-5006	
Saint Stephen's Episcopal Church			Culpeper	204-0003	
Seven Springs Farm			Pittsylvania	071-5255	
Shockoe Hill Burying Ground Historic District		Hospital St.	Richmond (city)	127-7231	(municipal almshouse-public hospital-cemetery complex)
Staunton River Bridge Fortification			Halifax	041-5276	at Fort Hill
Stroubles Creek Site			Montgomery	060-5042	
The White House (Page County, Virginia)			Page	069-0012	
Thermo-Con House		Fort Belvoir	Fairfax	029-5001	
Travis Lake Historic District			Caroline	016-5009	Rappahannock Academy
Tutter's Neck Site			James City	047-0033	
U.S. Army Package Power Reactor		Fort Belvoir	Fairfax	029-0193	
Upper Brandon Plantation			Prince George	074-0027	
Van Buren Furnace			Shenandoah	085-0051	
Vineyard Hill			Rockbridge	081-0071	
Warden Home			Chesapeake (city)	131-0093	
Wiley's Tavern Archaeological Site			Halifax	041-0039	
Wood Park			Orange	068-0055	
Zion Lutheran Church and Cemetery			Floyd	031-0024	

== See also ==
- List of National Historic Landmarks in Virginia
- National Register of Historic Places listings in Virginia
- Virginia Historic Landmark
