= Ephraim Vause =

Ephraim Vause (1718–1774) was a pioneer of southwestern Virginia, and Fort Vause in present day Shawsville, Virginia, was named after him. "This fort was named for Captain Ephraim Vause who was the first settler in that region. His name has been given various spellings, Vause, Voss, Vaus, Vass and Vaux."

== Biography ==
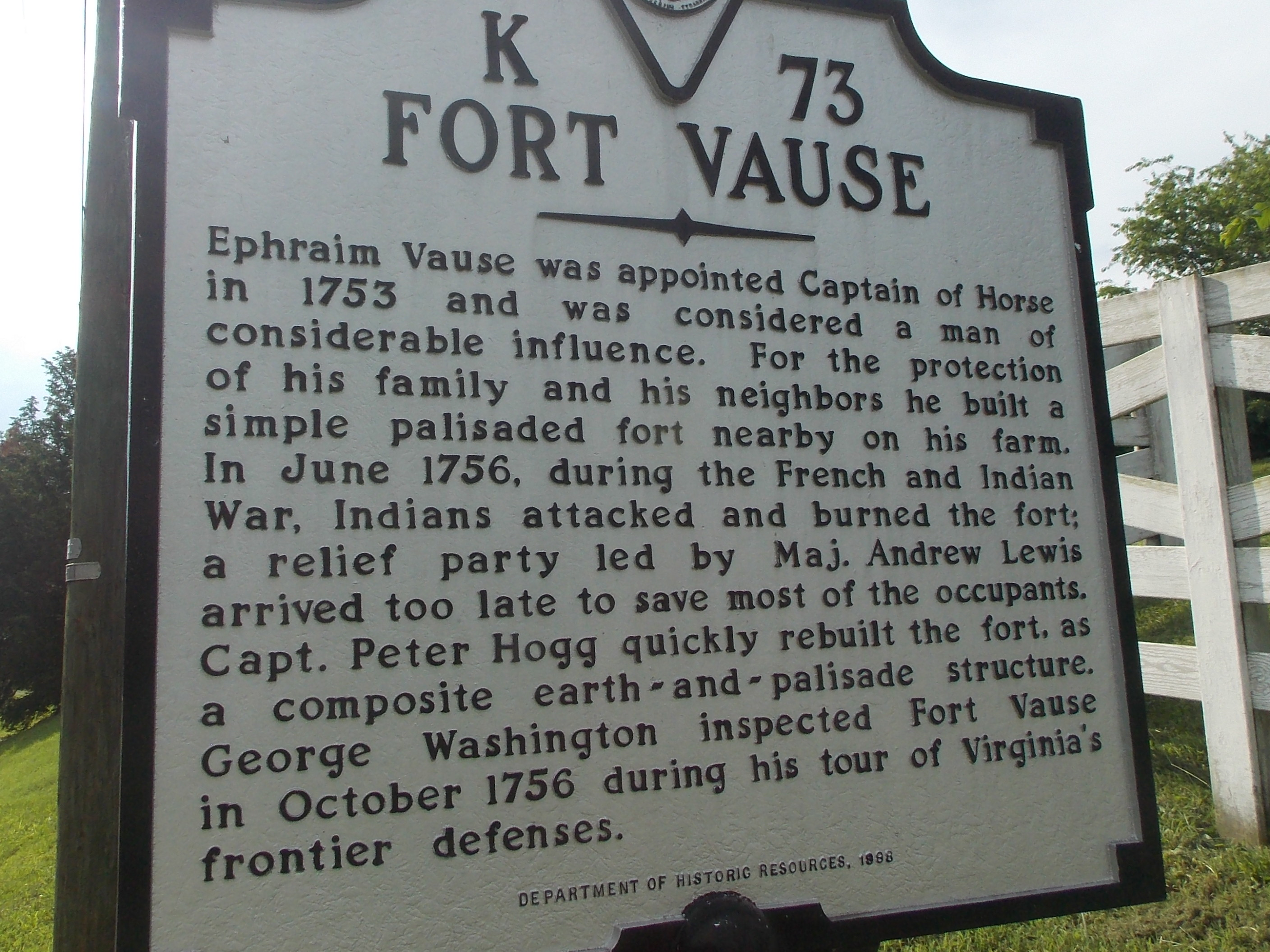
Fort Vause, Virginia, Historical Landmark

He was originally from his plantation in Evesham, New Jersey, and married Theodosia Hewlings (Hulings) in 1738 in Philadelphia. They had these children: Thomas Vause born about 1740; William Vause born 7 May 1741; Edward Vause born about 1743; Elizabeth Deliz "Livicee" Vause Hatfield born about 1745; Levi Vause born about 1748; Abner Vause born about 1758.

In 1743 a notice of a horse that was stolen or strayed from his property was published. He offered fifty shillings for the horse's return.

In Virginia, he became a noted individual in the neighborhood. In 1750 he helped inventory the estate of a neighbor who died, and was responsible for maintaining a portion of the road in the county.

At his home, he not only had a substantial house, but also a black slave and two Native American slaves as well. Earlier in June, 1756, Shawnee warriors took two of those servants and butchered some cattle in order to feed the advancing war parties with François-Marie Picoté de Belestre.

"By 1754, Vause owned 620 acres -- pretty much all of present day Shawsville, Virginia -- where he grew corn and wheat and raised cattle and horses. He had a house with clapboard siding. He was building a grist mill. He had indentured servants and a commission as a captain of horse militia. He and his wife and their children were well-to-do members of Augusta County society... [During the Shawnee attack on Fort Vause] Vause's home was burned, his livestock killed or run off, his wife, daughters and servants carried off and his dream of a frontier fortune ruined. He sold all his Virginia land and moved to Pennsylvania, where he lived until after the revolution."

In late 1757, Ephraim Vause attempted to organize a military expedition to rescue his wife and daughters. A number of men known as "The Associators" volunteered for this proposed expedition, and a total of 300 troops were expected to join. John Madison and the Augusta County Militia offered their support, and food and other supplies were obtained. Early in 1758, however, plans for the expedition were abandoned due to constant disputes among the commanding officers.

One of Ephraim Vause' daughters, Levicee, was carried away by the Shawnee after the attack. She later returned after the peace treaty of 1763, and reported that, as she had been carried along, she had carved her name on the trunks of beech and sycamore trees, thus giving her name to Levisa Fork.

Vause died in Russell County, Virginia.

== Bibliography ==
- Givens, Lula Porterfield. Highlights in the Early History of Montgomery County, Virginia. [Christiansburg, Va.]: Givens, 1975.
- Goode, Eddie. Fortifying the Frontier: Ephraim Vause & Fort Vause of Augusta County, Virginia 1755-1758. Charlottesville, Va: Virginia Foundation for the Humanities and Public Policy, 2002. Notes: Compilation of records pertaining to Ephraim Vause, his life, family and fort.
