= Fort Vause =

18th-century fort in Virginia, United States

- Montgomery County, Virginia, USA
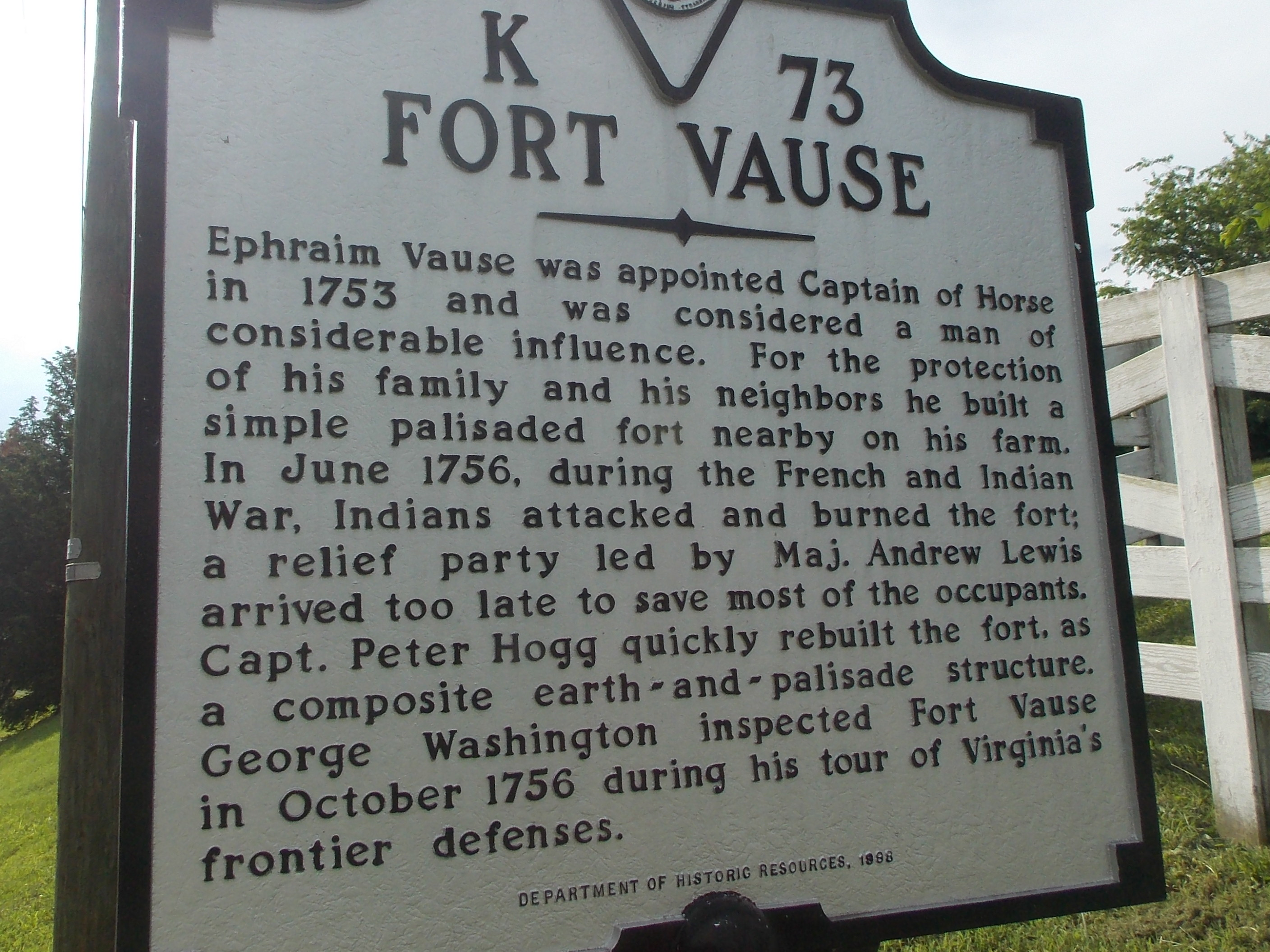
- 1998 state historical marker near Shawsville

Site information
- Type: Fort
- Controlled by: Privately owned land

Location
- Approximate location of Fort Vause in Virginia
- Coordinates: 37°10.312′N 80°15.83′W

Site history
- Built: 1753
- In use: 1753-1758
- Battles/wars: French and Indian War

Garrison information
- Past commanders: Captain John Smith; Captain Peter Hogg; Captain Henry Woodward
- Garrison: 25-170 troops

Virginia Landmarks Register
- Designated: December, 1969

Fort Vause (also known as Fort Vaux, Voss, Vass, Vance, or "Vass' Fort", and renamed Fort Lyttelton in 1757) was built in 1753 in Montgomery County, Virginia, by Ephraim Vause. The historic site is near the town of Shawsville, Virginia. It was attacked by French troops and Native American warriors in 1756, and most of the inhabitants were killed or taken prisoner. The fort was rebuilt in 1757 but abandoned by 1759.

== History ==
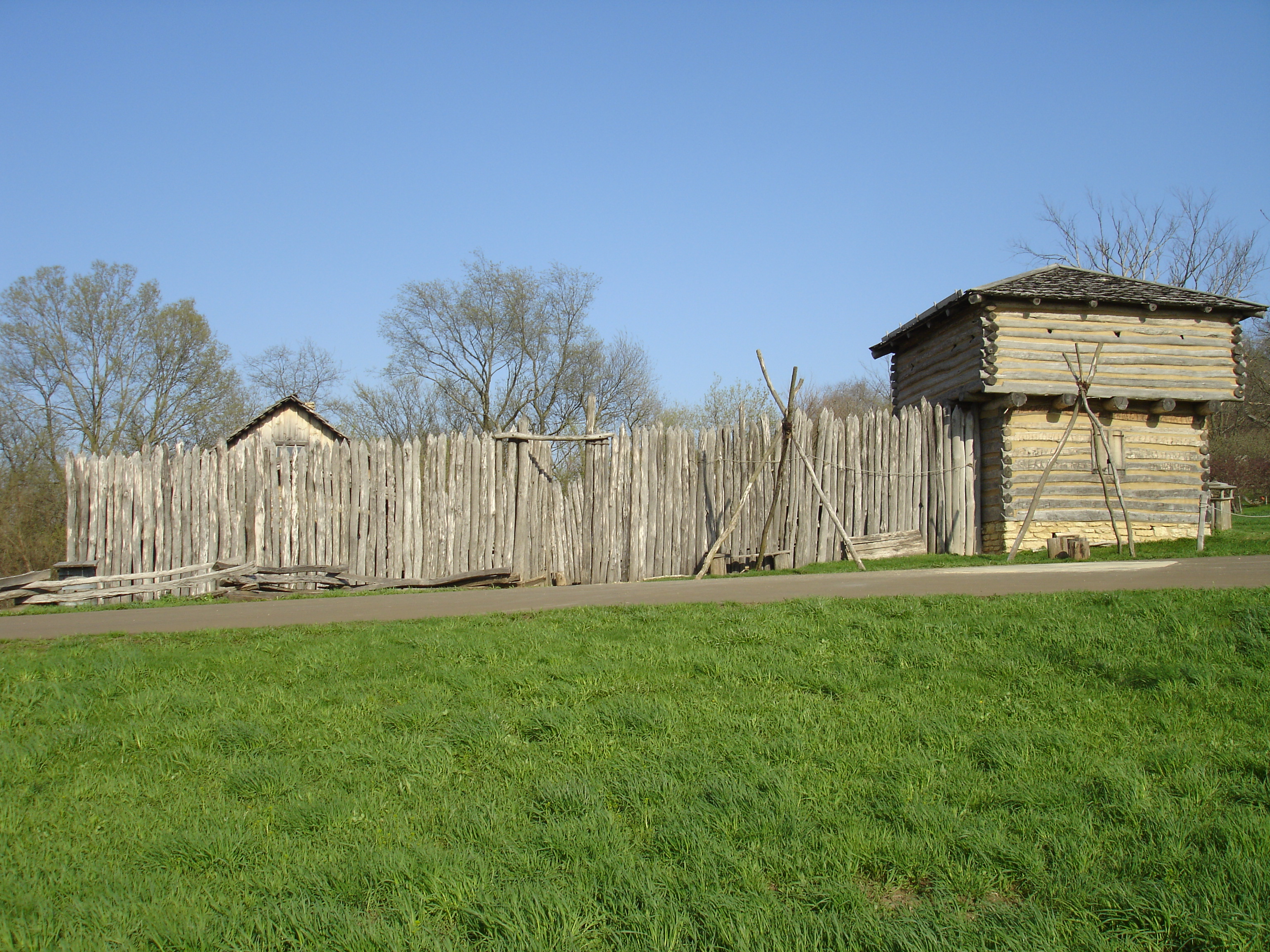
Reconstructed stockade and blockhouse similar to the original Fort Vause

The original fort was built in 1753 on the Great Wagon Road leading from Philadelphia to North Carolina, to protect the home of Ephraim Vause and his neighbors. There is no description of the fort, but privately built fortified homesteads of this period were typically stockades surrounding the farmhouse and outbuildings, in some cases including a crude two-storey blockhouse. Between 17 and 25 Virginia militia troops were stationed there in 1756, under the command of Captain John Smith.

Mary Draper Ingles and her husband William Ingles took refuge in the fort after their home was attacked during the Draper's Meadow Massacre of July, 1755, in which Mary and her sons were taken prisoner. Mary escaped and returned to her husband, and in early 1756 they moved to Fort Vause. According to one source, soon after their arrival, Mary had a premonition that the fort would be attacked and asked her husband to leave. Another source states that a settler who had been captured by the Indians escaped and came to the fort with a warning that the Shawnee were preparing to attack them. William and Mary Ingles left the fort on 25 June.

=== Siege and destruction ===
Later the same day, at "about ten in the morning," Fort Vause was attacked by 25 French soldiers together with 205 Miami, Ottawa and Shawnee warriors under the command of François-Marie Picoté de Belestre. John and Matthew Ingles, younger brothers of William, chose to remain at the fort after William decided to leave with Mary. John is credited with shooting a scout from a tree, and then sounding the alarm that the fort was about to be attacked. He was killed and his wife Mary and their children were taken prisoner. Matthew was out hunting at the time and was attacked on his way home. He fought hand-to-hand until his rifle broke, then with a frying pan handle, killing two of his attackers. He was taken prisoner by the Shawnee, but several years later was released or escaped. He died at Ingles Ferry, "a few months after his return."

George Washington wrote that a lack of vigilance by the sentries may have allowed the attackers to launch a surprise assault: "Indolent and careless, and always unguarded, [the sentries] are liable to be surprized. By this means Vass’s Fort was taken (and the Garrison destroyed)." However, the fort's commander, Captain John Smith, after being warned by the escaped settler, had been able to send a message on 22 June to Captain William Preston requesting help. One source says the 17 defenders held off the attackers for three days, whereas another source says the siege lasted only 8 hours, during which 32 of the attackers were killed. The French commander Belestre, who was also wounded during the siege, later reported that he had lost "near 40 Men." Eventually only three of the fort's defenders were still able to fight, and their ammunition gave out, at which point the garrison surrendered on condition that they be permitted to leave.

=== Aftermath ===
At least 3 settlers were killed, and 22 were taken prisoner, including Ephraim Vause's wife, his three daughters, a slave he owned and two of his servants (Ephraim was away on the day of the attack). The fort was burned and Shawnee warriors tortured and burned one of the fort's soldiers, a man named Cole. Two other prisoners were killed, a badly wounded soldier and an elderly man. The other prisoners were taken down the Mississippi River to New Orleans, after which several of them were then sent to Detroit and eventually transported to France. The fort's commander, Captain John Smith, was sent to England in an exchange of prisoners and returned to Virginia in early 1758. On 3 April 1758 Smith submitted a proposal to the Virginia House of Burgesses offering to lead an expedition against the Shawnee, but no action was taken.

A relief expedition of 47 men sent by Major Andrew Lewis and led by Captain William Preston arrived on 26 June, and found the fort abandoned. Preston's men followed the Indians into Kentucky but were unable to reach them.

On 10 July 1756, the French commander Belestre addressed a gathering of Shawnees allied with the French. His speech was recorded by a British prisoner, John Wotton, whose account was published in newspapers in Boston, New York and Philadelphia. Belestre was quoted, in part, as saying:

"I am now returned from war against the English, and have not compleated my Design so far as I intended. When I went away I thought to have gone down so far as the...James River [modern-day Richmond]. My spies gave me great encouragement and told me that I could go down to that place undiscovered, and plunder their Store, for there is no Men down there, but some Tobacco-Carriers. [This was prevented] by a small Company of Men, ten or eleven, which kept me the best Part of a Day very hot engaged, and killed near 40 Men...You told me Virginia Men could not fight, but I did not find it so; for these few Men that I found, fought more like Devils than Men; if all Virginia is like them, we cannot get that Country."

On 5 June 1757, Cherokee warriors defending Fort Cumberland on the Maryland-Virginia border captured Belestre, who had been leading raids against other English settlements.

In late 1757, Ephraim Vause attempted to organize a military expedition to rescue the prisoners, which included his wife and daughters. A number of men known as "The Associators" volunteered for this proposed expedition, and a total of 300 troops were expected to join. John Madison and the Augusta County Militia offered their support, and food and other supplies were obtained. Early in 1758, however, plans for the expedition were abandoned due to constant disputes among the commanding officers. Vause left the Shenandoah Valley soon afterwards, moved to Kentucky, and sold his land to John Madison in 1760. Vause's daughter Elizabeth Levicee Vause was held prisoner until she was released by agreement with Colonel Henry Bouquet in 1763.

=== Peter Looney ===
One prisoner, a 23-year-old sergeant named Peter Looney (or Lewney), was taken by Shawnees to Lower Shawneetown in Ohio. He was then sent to Detroit, where he was adopted by a Native American family. He became a respected warrior and attended important diplomatic meetings with the French. He later escaped from his captors at Niagara, New York and reached Albany on 12 July 1757. He traveled to Philadelphia and then returned to Virginia, reporting on the fate of Captain Smith.

== Rebuilding ==
Construction on a new fort was initiated by Captain Peter Hogg in 1756 as an earthworks and palisade construction. On 27 July 1756, Governor Robert Dinwiddie wrote orders on the fort's design: "It is agreed that...Fort Vaus be made at least one hundred feet Square in the Clear and that the Stockades be at least 14 feet Long." When completed, it was a 100-foot square four-bastioned earthwork with a 15-foot high log palisade, with barracks.

The fort was to be garrisoned with 100 men, although George Washington recommended 150. He visited the construction site in October 1756, as part of his tour of inspection of Southwestern Virginia. Washington wrote to Governor Dinwiddie that "Vass’s place is a pass of very great importance, being a very great inroad of the enemy, and secure, if it was strongly garrisoned." He noted in a November, 1756 proposal for the construction of frontier forts that "The fort at Vass’s, (which Capt. Hogg is now building) is in a much-exposed gap, subject to the inroads of the southern Indians." The garrison was increased by an additional 70 men in May, 1757.

Construction was delayed several times. Tools were difficult to obtain and they wore out quickly. The 30-man construction crew was paid sixpence per day, but in July 1756 they demanded an additional payment of 40 pounds of tobacco daily, which Washington refused to consider. Construction was still incomplete as of July 1757, and Washington was dissatisfied with the fort's location, writing to Hogg: "I have great complaints concerning your manner of carrying on the works at the Fort you are building. It has cost infinitely more money than ever was intended for it, and, by the injudicious spot of ground you have chosen to fix it upon, it has caused a general clamour." Washington replaced Captain Hogg with Lieutenant Thomas Bullitt, sending Captain Henry Woodward to supervise construction. On 29 July, Washington wrote to Woodward:

"As the Fort which Captn Hogg is building, and to which you are now going, has, either thro' bad conduct in the Director, idleness in the workman, or through some other cause which I can not comprehend, been of infinitely more expense to the country, and much longer about, than was ever expected–-You are required to finish it with the utmost dispatch; and in that in any manner, however rough, if it will secure you upon an attack."

Construction was completed by mid-August, at which point the fort was renamed Fort Lyttelton. By 1 September, Colonel Andrew Lewis reduced the garrison to one officer and twenty men, but records for February 1758 show a garrison of 74 men and 8 officers.

There is no mention of Fort Vause in colonial records after 1758, suggesting that it was abandoned, or possibly just used for storage. A single building from the second fort remained standing until 1903, when it was torn down.

== Archaeological excavations ==
The Fort Vause Archaeological Site was established in 1968. Archaeological test excavations undertaken in 1968 identified the location and general size of the second fort as well as evidence of its predecessor. Excavations in 2005-2006 located three bastions of the second fort, still visible today. Artifacts uncovered during these excavations included wrought iron nails, clay pipe stems, British Brown stoneware, salt-glazed stoneware, a cast iron kettle fragment, a gunflint, lead musket balls of several different calibers, and glass bottle fragments. The site is now on the property of the Hinshelwood family.

== Legacy ==
Fort Vause is a National Landmark, file #060-0017. A brass plaque mounted on a stone plinth was placed at the fort's site on 2 December 1969. A historical marker was placed near the site of the fort in 1998.

A replica of the fort was built at the Explore Park in Roanoke County, Virginia in 2004.

== See also ==
- Ephraim Vause
- French and Indian War
- Mary Draper Ingles
