= Attack on German Flatts (1757) =

Battle of the Seven Years' War

Coordinates: 43°1′34″N 74°59′25″W

- Part of the French and Indian War
Date	November 12, 1757
Location	German Flatts, Province of New York, British America present day Herkimer, New York State
Result	Franco-Indian victory

Belligerents
(Kingdom of France) France; New France; Seven Nations	Province of New York

Commanders and leaders
François-Marie Picoté de Belestre	Johan Jost Petrie

Strength
300 regulars, militia and Indian warriors	75 militia

Casualties and losses
5 wounded	40–50 killed 150 captured

The attack on German Flatts was an assault on the British North American settlement of German Flatts, New York, by a combined French-Indian force on November 12, 1757, during the French and Indian War. Seventy-five Palatine colonist militiamen were defeated by the 300-strong attacking force, and German Flatts was captured and destroyed. Between 40 and 50 of the colonists were killed, and 150 were captured; the French-Indian force only suffered 5 wounded.

== Background ==
The campaign season for 1757 had been a successful one for authorities in New France. The British had failed in an expedition against Louisbourg on Île Royale (now known as Cape Breton Island in northernmost Nova Scotia), and were defeated by the French and their Indian allies in the Battle of Fort William Henry at the southern end of Lake George, on the frontier between the British Province of New York and the French Province of Canada. New France's governor, the Marquis de Vaudreuil, had attempted to convince German settlers in the Mohawk River valley to support the French cause. When the Germans failed to do so in the assault on Fort William Henry in August, Vaudreuil decided to send a punitive expedition against them. He attacked the settlement called German Flatts, on the north side of the Mohawk River west of Little Falls (where present-day Herkimer, New York, is located, not the modern German Flatts on the south side of the river).

Vaudreuil assembled a force of about 300 at Lachine under the command of François-Marie Picoté de Belestre, an experienced commander in the troupes de la marine. On October 20, the company left Lachine and traveled up the Saint Lawrence River and along the shore of Lake Ontario to the mouth of the Oswego River, site of another French victory at the Battle of Fort Oswego in 1756. From there they traveled up the river, crossed the Oneida Carry to the Mohawk River, and descended to German Flatts. They arrived near the settlement on November 11.

At the time, German Flatts consisted of about 60 homes and 300 settlers, with five fortified blockhouses. Although Oneida had warned of the attack, the settlers had made no defensive preparations.

== Attack ==
On November 12, 1757, at around 3 am, Belestre's force launched an attack on German Flatts from the hills north of the village. The five blockhouses quickly surrendered before the superior force. Forty people were killed or drowned, all the buildings were destroyed, and more than 150 of the inhabitants, men, women and children, including the mayor, the surgeon, and some militia officers were captured and taken back to Montreal. Some of the inhabitants fled across the Mohawk to Fort Herkimer for safety. The fort's commander sent out a detachment of fifty men, but they retreated after a brief exchange of gunfire with Belestre's force. The next day Belestre departed, his canoes loaded with prisoners and plunder; he returned to Montreal on November 20.

== Aftermath ==
News reached Schenectady, 60 miles to the east along the Mohawk river, the day after the attack. General George Howe immediately came up the river with the 42nd Regiment, but found nothing more than the smoking ruins of the settlement.

Most of the prisoners were later exchanged for those held by the British. Gradually the German residents returned and rebuilt the settlement. During the American Revolutionary War, German Flatts was attacked in 1778, with considerable loss of life and crops. Fighting on the frontier in the valley was fierce during those years.
