= François-Marie Picoté de Belestre =

French colonial military commander (1716-1793)

François-Marie Picoté, sieur de Belestre II (17 November 1716 – 30 March 1793) was a colonial soldier for both New France and Great Britain.

As a soldier in the French troupes de la marine, Belestre fought against British and American colonial troops for 30 years, from Nova Scotia to the Mississippi River valley. Belestre became famous during the wars between France and Great Britain, serving in the North American theater of the Seven Years' War, also known as the French and Indian War (1754–63). He was one of the last officers of New France to surrender to British troops. In 1758, Belestre became the thirteenth and last official French Commandant of Fort Ponchartrain (Fort Detroit). His term ended in 1760 with the end of French rule in Detroit, after which he was sent to England. He returned to Quebec under British rule, and joined the British troops which defended Fort Saint Jean from American colonial forces in 1775. He became a colonel in the British Army before his death.

== Biography ==
François-Marie Picoté de Belestre was born in Lachine, in the French province of Canada on 17 November 1716. In 1738 he married Marie Anne Nivard Saint-Dizier, the daughter of Pierre Nivard Saint-Dizier, in Montreal. They had six children: François-Louis (1739) (ref: Joachime Coulon de Villiers in 1762 in Fort Chartres), Marie-Joseph (1741), Etienne (1742), François-Xavier (1743), Anne (1746) & Marie-Archangel (1748). In 1739, he followed his father into the military, embarking on a career in the Troupes de la marine, the colonial military of New France. He saw service in the Chickasaw Wars and was active in battles against the Iroquois. He was promoted to second ensign in 1741.

=== Conflict with British colonies ===
When Louisbourg fell early in King George's War, Belestre was sent to Acadia to assist in resistance against the British occupation. By 1747 he was back on the western frontier, working with Pierre Joseph Céloron de Blainville to supply Fort Detroit. During the 1740s British colonists had begun to penetrate the Ohio Country and were competing successfully with the French in the lucrative fur trade. Belestre was sent to Paris in 1749 to report on the state of affairs with the Indians.

1749 to 1759: he is given the responsibility to look after and maintain the trade of fur in Michigan.

1751: he is asked to carry out a punitive raid on "La Demoiselle" village (ref: post, 417, 419, 444).

1751 (Fall) to 1752: he is sent to France to be cured of a wound and report of the situation. (A N Colonies C11A 97:198).

1751 (end) or 1752: Promoted to the rank of Lieutenant.

1752: he is back in Canada, in charge of Wabash Post (ref: Ibid., 119:316).

1753: On January 29, following the death of his wife, Belestre married Marie Ann Magnan also in Montreal.

1754: He was recommended for promotion to ensign "en pied". (ref: Ibid, 99:282v.)

=== Seven Years' War ===
In 1755 Belestre commanded a troop of colonial marines and Indians in the decisive Battle of the Monongahela, in which British General Edward Braddock's forces were routed. For his contribution to the victory, Belestre was awarded the Order of Saint Louis. In April 1756, he led a raiding party of 20 French soldiers and 150 Miami, Ouiatonon, and Shawnee into the Carolinas, capturing Fort Vause on the way. Later that year he participated in Montclam's victory in the Battle of Fort Oswego. He was then promoted to lieutenant, and placed in command of Fort de Miami.

In the summer of 1757, he was ordered to raid Fort Cumberland on the Virginia frontier. He led an expedition with 12 French soldiers, 40 allied natives and 300 men but on June 5 they were attacked on their way back by Cherokees allied to the British. Belestre's nephew, Philippe Dagneau of Saussaye, St. Ours and three French soldiers were killed, and Belestre was captured.

Belestre was brought to Fort Loudoun, in Winchester, VA, where he was questioned by Edmund Atkyn, Superintendent of Indian Affairs in the presence of Colonel George Washington and George Croghan, Deputy to Sir William Johnson. It is uncertain if he was released or if he escaped, but he succeeded in finding his way back to Montreal by early fall 1757. On November 28, he took what remained of his troops—about 300 Canadians and Indians soldiers—toward Fort Frontenac (now Kingston, Ontario). They move east towards the Mohawk River valley. Captain Belestre received the order, probably from Vaudreuil, the Governor of New France, to attack the Palatine settlement of German Flatts, where they destroyed the place, killing 40 German settlers and taking 150 prisoners (men, women and children). Most of the houses and buildings were burned. Using this "hit and run" tactic, common during this war, the damage caused was important. This last raid was regarded as a considerable victory for France, by the fact that this relatively small team had succeeded in penetrating deep into New York without opposition. They took what remained of the food, horses and cows, which they carried back to Montreal.

In 1758 Belestre was promoted to captain and became the 13th official commander of Fort Ponchartrain du Detroit, founded by Antoine de Lamothe Cadillac in 1701. This happened after the death of the Detroit commandant, Nicholas D'aneau, Sieur de Muy in 1758. Assisted by Pierre Passerat de La Chapelle, he commanded a small army in a fort which was more of a fur trading center than a military fortress. Because of the many Indian allies camped around the fort, it was not considered necessary by the French Army to garrison the post with many troops like it was in the past. But it soon became a warehouse of supplies and equipment for the troops in the northwest of New France. As the French settlements in the east started falling to British forces in 1759, some citizens of New France fled to Detroit seeking protection. He participated in the French effort to relieve Fort Niagara that same year.

More colonial troops were sent to fortify Fort Detroit in 1760. But in September 1760, Governor Vaudreuil surrendered Montreal and the rest of New France to the British. At that time, all communications with France and the rest of the French troops were broken, and Fort Detroit and other frontier outposts became completely isolated; Belestre knew nothing of the French capitulation.

British General Jeffery Amherst then ordered Major Robert Rogers to ascend the St. Lawrence and the Great Lakes, to take command of the French forts at Detroit, Michilimackinac and elsewhere. Rogers was also given instructions to avoid battle unless necessary. On September 13, 1760, with "two hundred Rangers in fifteen whale-boats" (some archives mention the 60th Royal Americans troops and Rogers' Rangers), Rogers left Montreal.

Approaching Fort Detroit in late November, Rogers sent a runner with a letter for Belestre, notifying him that the western posts now belonged to King George. His messenger explained to Belestre that Rogers had a letter from the Marquis de Vaudreuil and a copy of the capitulation. Belestre got very upset, irritated by the news, and the idea that he could lose his post. Could he trust Rogers, an enemy? No real proofs were given. Four hundred soldiers were stationed at the entrance of the Detroit River to obstruct any further advance from Rogers' troops. Belestre intended to fight and arrested the officer who delivered Rogers' message. Belestre's doubts were reinforced by the fact that no French officers had confirmed the situation in Montreal and he sent messengers to try to find out the truth. The next morning, near to what is now Ecorse city (Michigan), the British troops approached Fort Detroit and Rogers sent Captain Donald Campbell with a small party to Belestre, carrying an official copy of Montreal's capitulation together with Vaudreuil's letter instructing Belestre to surrender the fort to him. These documents were convincing enough, and Belestre capitulated. On November 29, Rogers took possession of Fort Detroit.

=== British rule ===
Captain Campbell took over command of the fort, while Belestre and his soldiers were made prisoners of war and sent to Philadelphia in chains, escorted by two officers under the command of Lieutenant Holmes and twenty men. This ended Belestre's career as a French military officer. He was sent to England, still a prisoner.

Although Belestre was in bitter spirit about the defeat, he was also very disappointed about the French Crown, letting New France and his Acadians down. He then found out that the French government was near bankruptcy after the Seven Years' War, and had little choice but to stop fighting. He became reconciled to British rule, and decided that he would prefer to return with his family to Montreal where he was born. In 1764, he was released in England and returned to Canada via France.

He then became a highly respected citizen of Quebec, serving in 1767 on a jury that heard the case of Thomas Walker, a British merchant and justice who was assaulted in his home after he handed down an unfavourable judgment. In 1771 Belestre took part in St. Peter's Lodge (Provincial Grand Lodge of Quebec) as "Premier Surveillant" with Pierre Gamelin.

=== American Revolutionary War ===
When the American Revolutionary War broke out in 1775, and the rebel colonists launched an invasion of Quebec, he volunteered his services in defence of Fort Saint-Jean on the Richelieu River. The fort was besieged in September by Continental Army forces, and Belestre was taken prisoner when the garrison surrendered.

1776: on May 1, he was named "Grand Voyer" of the Province of Quebec and as recognition for his services in the Revolutionary War, was made provincial lieutenant-colonel in the Québec Militia on July 12, 1790.

1775: Member of the legislative Council on August 17.

=== Later years ===
1784: appointed as member of the executive Council.

1792: He was decorated with the Saint Helena Medal.

1792 : from January - to March 30, 1792 when he became too weak, he was appointed a member to the first Legislative Council of Lower Canada, where he served for 3 months.

1793 (March 30): he died in Montreal, at the age of 76 years and 4 months. He was buried in the parish of Notre-Dame, April 2.

== Origins & descendants ==
=== Origins ===
Belestre's family comes from the French nobility and their line can be traced back to France in the 15th century. The family played a significant role in the affairs of the French regime, New France and subsequently after the English takeover in about 1760.

Belestre's father bears the same name - Francois Marie Picote, Sieur de Belestre I (born in Montreal 1677 - 1729). His father was described as an officer or garrison commander of the fort of Ville-Marie (now Montréal), a title that he shared with Adam Dollard des Ormeaux, (1635 – May 1660). His father was also governor of Fort Detroit as acting Commandant in de Tonty's absence, in winter 1721-22. His mother was Marie-Catherine Trottier des Ruisseaux de Beaubien (1681–1731).

Belestre is a descendant of "Pierre Picotté, Sieur de Belestre" (as listed within the « Recensement de Montréal en 1666 » when he was 39 years old).

=== Descendants ===
François-Louis, Francois Marie's oldest son by the first marriage, followed his father into the troupes de la marine and later settled in Louisiana. After the Expulsion of the Acadians, descendants of Belestre (or Belletre, Bélêtre) were dispersed throughout North America, Germany and France.

== Character ==
Belestre had the reputation of a courageous, resistant & brave fighter and it has been written that "Belestre has surmounted all the obstacles which arose before him at each instant." Belestre was considered a capable and efficient warrior by his superiors and a frightening threat for his enemies. It is surprising that he was not killed while fighting, or executed once made prisoner of war on several occasions. According to reports found in the Quebec Historical Society, "After the capture of Fort DuQuesne in 1758, General Forbes planned an attack on Detroit. Sieur de Belestre, having heard that the enemy was marching, put himself at the head of the Hurons and other Indians to give an attack to the advance guard, which he defeated." Belestre was also said to write "French with an inimitable German phonetization" in a Paris journal.

== See also ==
- Legislative Council of Lower Canada
- Adam Dollard des Ormeaux
