= Hamner House (Schuyler, Virginia) =

- U.S. National Register of Historic Places
- Location: 128 Treetop Loop, Schuyler, Virginia
- Area: 0.3 acres (0.12 ha)
- Built: 1915
- Architectural style: Late Victorian, Victorian Folk
- NRHP reference No.: 04001293
- Added to NRHP: October 21, 2004

The Hamner House in Schuyler, Virginia was nominated for listing on the National Register of Historic Places in 2004. Its listing status in the National Register's database is "DR" so it is not clear whether it was listed or not. The house is also known as Jay Hamner House and as Copps House. It has Virginia State DHR# 062–0282.
