= Shawsville, Virginia =

- Census-designated place (CDP)
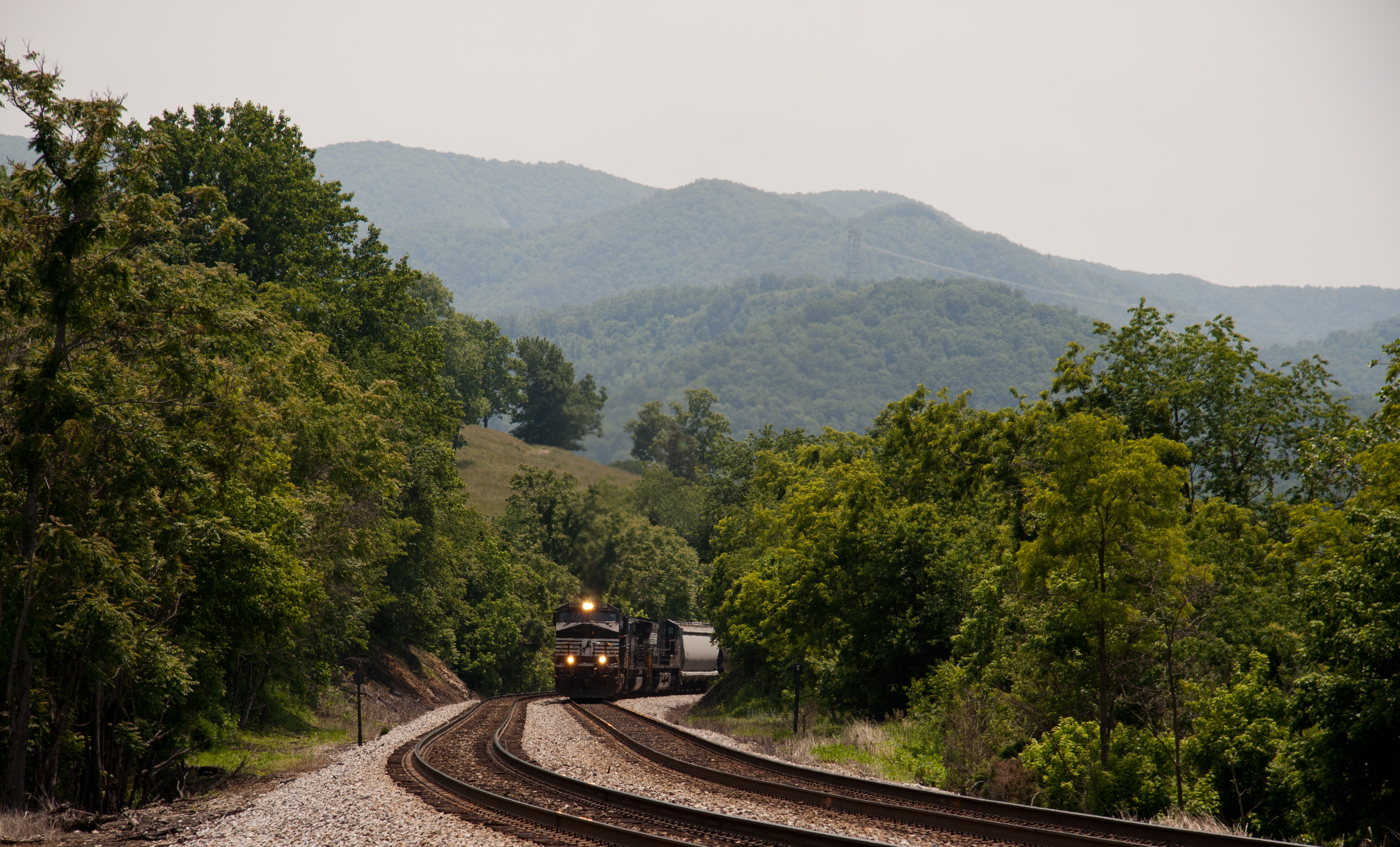
- Shawsville, Virginia

- Location within Shenandoah Valley Location within Virginia Location within the United States
- Coordinates: 37°10′24″N 80°14′55″W
- Country: United States
- State: Virginia
- County: Montgomery

Area
  - Total: 2.3 sq mi (6.0 km^{2})
  - Land: 2.3 sq mi (6.0 km^{2})
  - Water: 0 sq mi (0.0 km^{2})
- Elevation: 1,440 ft (439 m)

Population (2010)
  - Total: 1,310
  - Density: 570/sq mi (220/km^{2})
- Time zone: UTC−5 (Eastern (EST))
  - Summer (DST): UTC−4 (EDT)
- ZIP code: 24162
- Area code: 540
- FIPS code: 51-71632
- GNIS feature ID: 1496211

Shawsville is a census-designated place (CDP) in Montgomery County, Virginia, United States. As of the 2020 census, Shawsville had a population of 1,241. It is part of the Blacksburg–Christiansburg Metropolitan Statistical Area which encompasses all of Montgomery County, Virginia, and the city of Radford.

== History ==
The town is near the site of Fort Vause, built in 1753 by Ephraim Vause, which was attacked and destroyed by Shawnee Indians on 25 June 1756, during the French and Indian War. An unknown number of people were killed and about 150 were taken prisoner at Fort Vause. A relief party led by Major Andrew Lewis arrived too late. The fort was rebuilt within months and inspected by General George Washington in October 1756 as part of his tour of frontier defenses.

The Rife House, Shawsville Historic District, and Walnut Grove Farm are listed on the National Register of Historic Places.

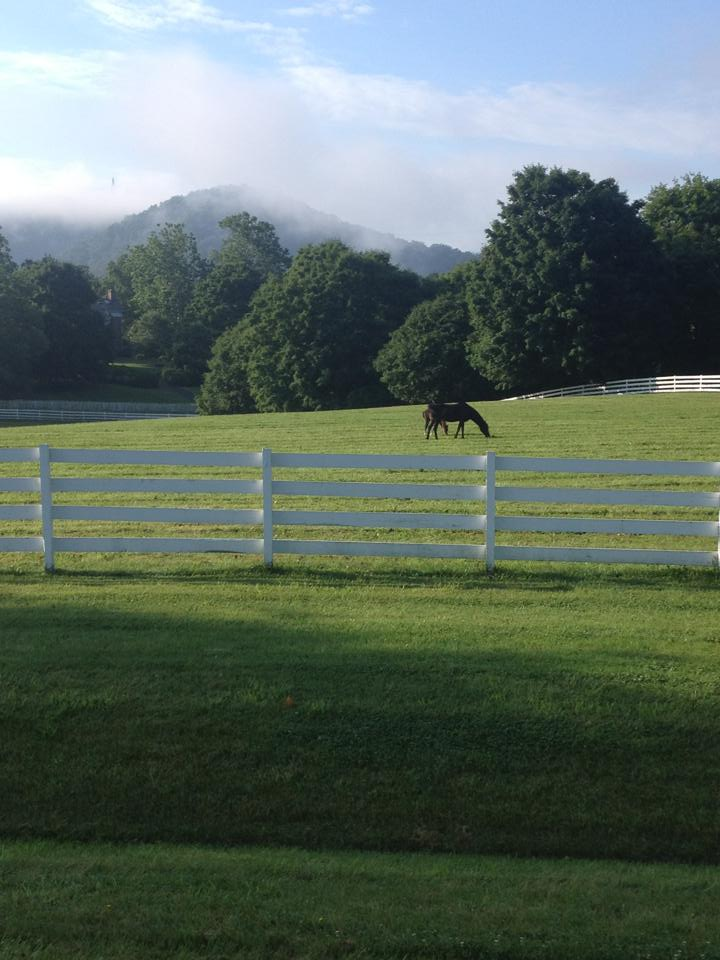
Shawsville, Virginia

== Geography ==
Shawsville is located at 37°10′24″N 80°14′55″W (37.173248, −80.248580).

According to the United States Census Bureau, the CDP has a total area of 2.3 square miles (6.0 km^{2}), all land.

== Demographics ==
As of the census of 2000, there were 1,029 people, 431 households, and 299 families residing in the CDP. The population density was 444.1 people per square mile (171.2/km^{2}). There were 443 housing units at an average density of 191.2/sq mi (73.7/km^{2}). The racial makeup of the CDP was 96.21% White, 1.07% African American, 0.58% Native American, 0.10% Asian, 0.49% from other races, and 1.55% from two or more races. Hispanic or Latino of any race were 0.78% of the population.

There were 431 households, out of which 35.0% had children under the age of 18 living with them, 49.2% were married couples living together, 12.5% had a female householder with no husband present, and 30.6% were non-families. 23.9% of all households were made up of individuals, and 7.7% had someone living alone who was 65 years of age or older. The average household size was 2.39 and the average family size was 2.79.

In the CDP the population was spread out, with 25.6% under the age of 18, 8.6% from 18 to 24, 31.6% from 25 to 44, 24.3% from 45 to 64, and 10.0% who were 65 years of age or older. The median age was 34 years. For every 100 females, there were 100.6 males. For every 100 females age 18 and over, there were 94.4 males.

The median income for a household in the CDP was $31,953, and the median income for a family was $36,667. Males had a median income of $32,679 versus $19,783 for females. The per capita income for the CDP was $27,174. About 6.9% of families and 10.2% of the population were below the poverty line, including 8.3% of those under age 18 and 8.9% of those age 65 or over.

== Controversy with Elliston ==
The community of Elliston-Lafayette is approximately four miles east of Shawsville. The majority of US 460 between the communities is a completely straight stretch of road, which is not common in this area of Virginia, known locally as the Elliston Straightaway. During the 1990s, there was some minor controversy between Elliston and Shawsville about how far down the Elliston Straightaway would be the appropriate place for a "Welcome to Shawsville" sign. The sign was vandalized and removed before being replaced. Additionally, the former Shawsville Elementary School building also resides in 24087, the Elliston ZIP Code.

== Notable people ==
- Henry A. Edmundson, politician
- Mujaddid Ahmed Ijaz, nuclear physicist
- Madison Marye, politician
- Butch Taylor, musician, Dave Matthews Band
- Jimmy Valiant, professional wrestler
