= Tennessee State Route 72 =

State highway in Tennessee, United States

State Route 72
- SR 72 mainline in red

Route information
- Maintained by TDOT
- Length: 43.3 mi (69.7 km)
- Existed: October 1, 1923–present

Major junctions
- West end: SR 58 near Midway
- I-75 in Loudon; US 11 in Loudon; US 411 in Vonore
- East end: US 129 near Tallassee

Location
- Country: United States
- State: Tennessee
- Counties: Roane, Loudon, Monroe, Blount

Highway system
- Tennessee State Routes; Interstate; US; State
← US 72	→ SR 73

State Route 72 (SR 72) is a 43.3-mile-long (69.7 km) state highway in the eastern portion of U.S. state of Tennessee. It travels through the towns of Vonore and Loudon. Although the entire highway travels within the Tennessee River and Little Tennessee River watersheds, respectively, it crosses the Litttle Tennessee once over Tellico Lake in Vonore.

== Route description ==
=== Roane County ===
SR 72 begins in Roane County at an intersection with SR 58 just east of Midway. It then goes east as a narrow, curvy, 2-lane highway as it goes through Midway and then some mountains before entering Paint Rock and having a junction with SR 322, a loop route through Sweetwater. It stays curvy as it crosses more mountains and enters Loudon County.

=== Loudon County ===
It then begins paralleling the Tennessee River as it enters Loudon, and finally leaves the mountains and curves behind. SR 72 then has an interchange with I-75 before going through Loudon's main business district and having a junction with US 11/SR 2. It then bypasses downtown to the south before leaving Loudon and the Tennessee River to turn and go southeast, entering the Little Tennessee River watershed. SR 72 continues southeast through farmland, leading to an intersection with SR 444 (Tellico Parkway), which provides access to Tellico Village, Tellico Lake, and Lenoir City.

=== Monroe and Blount Counties ===
SR 72 then crosses into Monroe County and enters Vonore, intersects with the other end of SR 322, and comes to an intersection with US 411/SR 33. It becomes concurrent with then and they travel east into downtown, where they intersect SR 360, which provides access to Fort Loudoun and Fort Loudoun State Park. They then cross the Little Tennessee River/Tellico Lake, before SR 72 separates and turns south. It then follows the banks of the lake, crossing into Blount County for a short distance, before ending at an intersection with US 129/SR 115 near Tallassee.

== Junction list ==
County	Location	mi	km	Destinations	Notes
Roane	Midway	0.0	0.0	SR 58 (Decatur Highway) – Kingston, Decatur, Chattanooga	Western terminus
Roane	Paint Rock	5.4	8.7	SR 322 east (Sweetwater Road) – Sweetwater	Western terminus of SR 322
Loudon	Loudon	13.8	22.2	I-75 – Chattanooga, Knoxville	I-75 exit 72
Loudon	Loudon	16.2	26.1	US 11 (Mulberry Street/SR 2) – Loudon, Sweetwater	
Loudon	Tellico Village	23.3	37.5	SR 444 east (Tellico Parkway) – Tellico Village, Lenoir City	Western terminus of SR 444
Monroe	No major junctions				
Loudon	No major junctions				
Monroe	Vonore	27.1	43.6	SR 322 west (Sweetwater-Vonore Road) – Sweetwater	Eastern terminus of SR 322
Monroe	Vonore	29.3	47.2	US 411 south (Highway 411/SR 33) – Madisonville	Southern end of US 411/SR 33 concurrency
Monroe	Vonore	31.7	51.0	SR 360 south (Unicoi Turnpike) – Fort Loudoun State Historic Park, Tellico Plains	Northern terminus of SR 360
Monroe	Vonore	34.3	55.2	US 411 north (Highway 411/SR 33) – Maryville	Northern end of US 411/SR 33 concurrency
Blount	No major junctions				
Monroe	Pumpkin Center	43.3	69.7	US 129 (Calderwood Highway/SR 115) – Maryville, Fontana	Eastern terminus of SR 72
1.000 mi = 1.609 km; 1.000 km = 0.621 mi: Concurrency terminus
