= Tennessee State Route 322 =

Highway in the US

State Route 322
- SR 322 highlighted in red

Route information
- Maintained by TDOT
- Length: 22.0 mi (35.4 km)
- Existed: July 1, 1983–present

Major junctions
- West end: SR 72 in Paint Rock
- I-75 in Sweetwater; US 11 in Sweetwater
- East end: SR 72 in Vonore

Location
- Country: United States
- State: Tennessee
- Counties: Roane, Loudon, Monroe

Highway system
- Tennessee State Routes; Interstate; US; State
← SR 321	→ SR 323

State Route 322 (SR 322) is an east–west state highway in East Tennessee, connecting Paint Rock with Vonore via Sweetwater. It serves as an alternate route for SR 72, bypassing Loudon.

== Route description ==
SR 322 begins in Roane County in Paint Rock at an intersection with SR 72. It goes southeast as Sweetwater Road and traverses some ridges and valleys before curving east to enter farmland and shortly passing through the southernmost part of Loudon County. SR 322 then crosses in Monroe County as Oakland Road to enter Sweetwater at an interchange with I-75 (Exit 62). It continues east to bypass downtown to the north and have an intersection with US 11/SR 2. The highway then leaves Sweetwater and continues east through farmland as Sweetwater Vonore Road. SR 322 then makes a sharp right at an intersection with Loudon Road before crossing over a ridge and coming to an end at another intersection with SR 72 at the northwest corner of Vonore.

== Major intersections ==
County	Location	mi	km	Destinations	Notes
Roane	Paint Rock	0.0	0.0	SR 72 (Loudon Highway) – Kingston, Midway, Loudon	Western terminus
Loudon	No major junctions				
Monroe	Sweetwater			I-75 – Chattanooga, Knoxville	I-75 exit 62
Monroe	Sweetwater			US 11 (N Main Street/SR 2) – Athens, Niota, Philadelphia, Loudon	
Monroe	Vonore	22.0	35.4	SR 72 – Loudon, Vonore	Eastern terminus
1.000 mi = 1.609 km; 1.000 km = 0.621 mi
