= Tennessee State Route 444 =

State highway in Tennessee, United States

State Route 444
- Tellico Parkway
- TN 444 highlighted in red

Route information
- Maintained by TDOT
- Length: 11.1 mi (17.9 km)

Major junctions
- West end: SR 72 near Vonore
- East end: US 321 near Lenoir City

Location
- Country: United States
- State: Tennessee
- Counties: Loudon

Highway system
- Tennessee State Routes; Interstate; US; State
← SR 443	→ SR 445

State Route 444 (SR 444) is a 11.1-mile-long (17.9 km) state highway completely within Loudon County in the eastern portion of the U.S. state of Tennessee. It serves the resort community of Tellico Village, and connects the village with Lenoir City.

== Route description ==
SR 444 begins at an intersection with SR 72. It travels to the northeast, crossing over a segment of Tellico Lake and passing through the resort community of Tellico Village, the highway passes northwest of Toqua Golf Club. After skirting along the western shore of the lake, SR 444 travels farther to the west. It curves back to the east, passing through Tanasi Golf Club. The highway then crosses over another segment of the lake and leaves Tellico Village. Then, it curves to the northeast. After a curve to the southeast, it meets its eastern terminus, an interchange with US 321/SR 73/SR 95 just southeast of Lenoir City.

== Major intersections ==
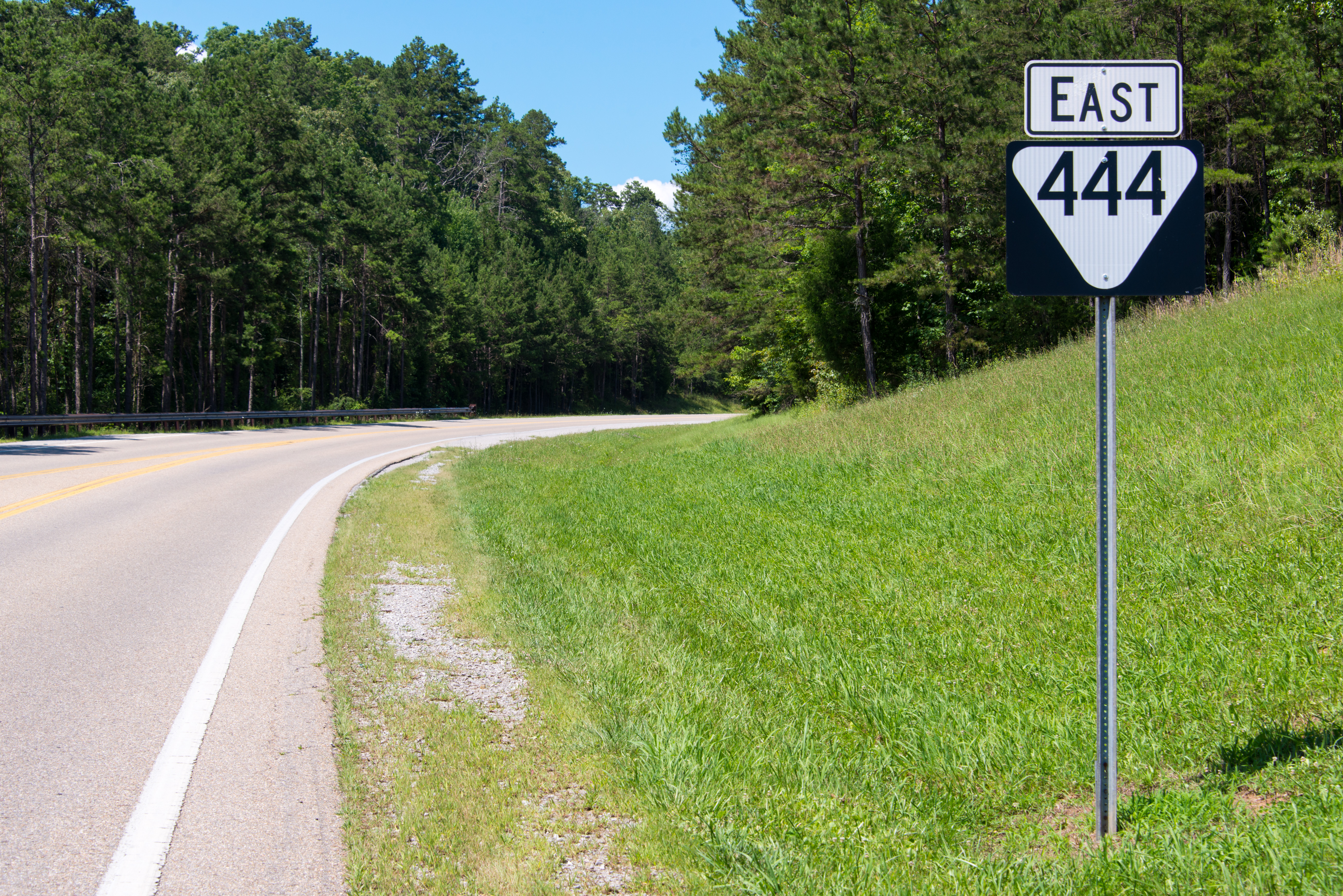
SR 444, in Tellico Village

The entire route is in Loudon County.

Location	mi	km	Destinations	Notes
	0.0	0.0	SR 72 – Vonore, Loudon	Western terminus
	11.1	17.9	US 321 (SR 73/SR 95) – Lenoir City, Maryville	Eastern terminus
1.000 mi = 1.609 km; 1.000 km = 0.621 mi

== See also ==
- List of state routes in Tennessee
- List of highways numbered 444
