= Knoxville metropolitan area =

Metropolitan area in Tennessee, United States

Greater Knoxville
- Metropolitan statistical area
- Knoxville, TN Metropolitan Statistical Area
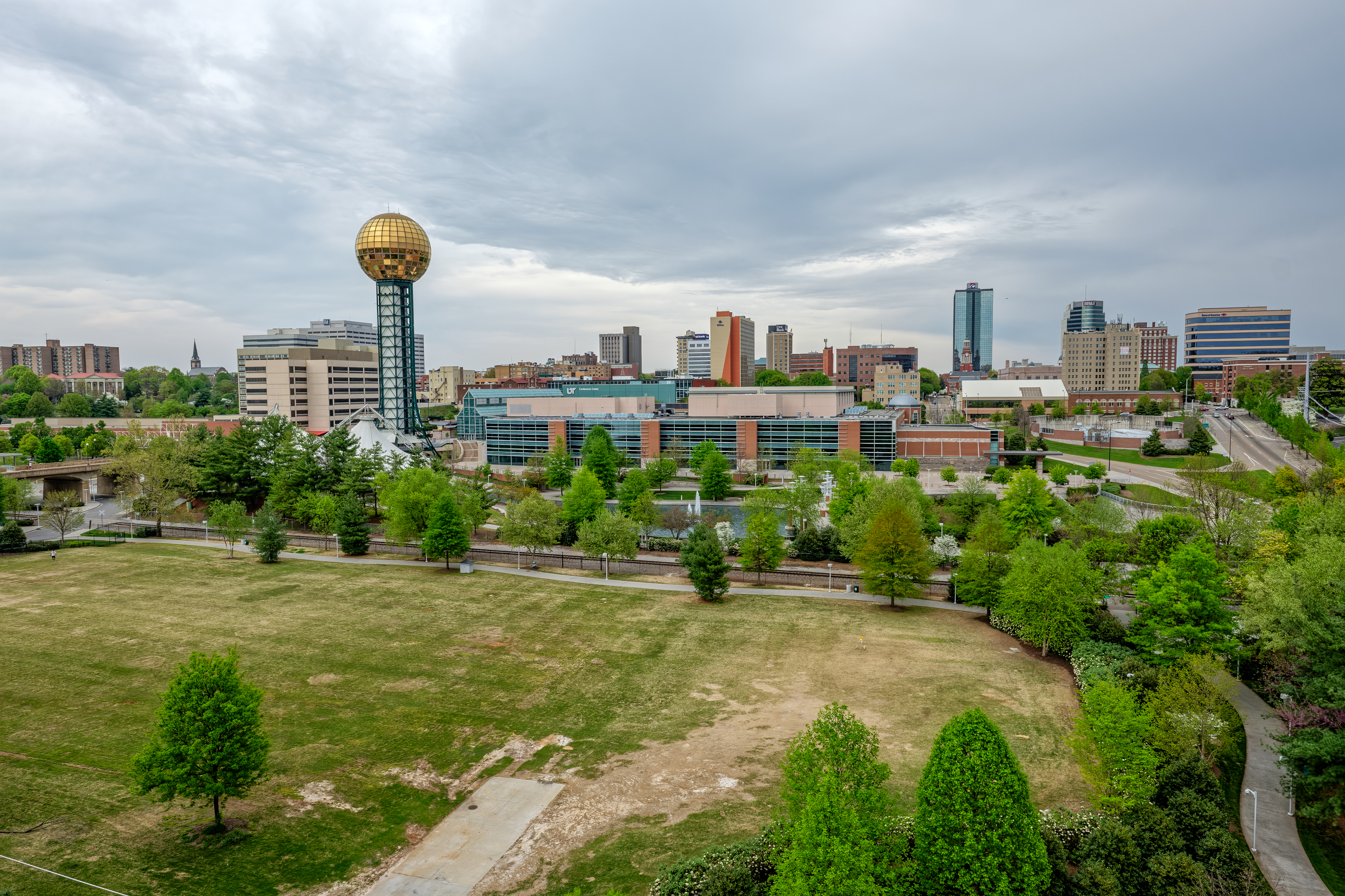
- Knoxville skyline

- Knoxville metropolitan area
- Country: United States
- State: Tennessee
- Principal city: Knoxville
- Largest cities: Knoxville; Maryville; Oak Ridge

Population (2020)
  - Total: 903,300 ▲

GDP
  - MSA: $58.893 billion (2022)
- Time zone: UTC−5 (Eastern Time Zone (EST))
  - Summer (DST): UTC−4 (EDT)
- Area codes: 423, 865

The Knoxville metropolitan area, commonly known as Greater Knoxville, is a metropolitan statistical area (MSA) centered on Knoxville, Tennessee, the third largest city in Tennessee and the largest city in East Tennessee. It is the third largest metropolitan area in Tennessee. In 2020, the Knoxville metro area (the MSA as defined by the United States Census Bureau) had a population of 903,300. The Knoxville–Morristown–Newport–Sevierville Combined Statistical Area (CSA) had a population of 1,156,861 according to the census bureau in 2020.

== Definitions ==
As defined at the time of the 2010 United States census, the Knoxville area was the third largest Metropolitan Statistical Area (MSA) in Tennessee. It retained that ranking in the 2020 United States census.

For Census purposes, the Knoxville MSA was defined in 2023 to consist of the following nine Tennessee counties:

County	Seat	2025 Estimate	2020 Census	Change	Area	Density
Knox	Knoxville	511,453	478,971	+6.78%	256 sq mi (660 km^{2})	972/sq mi (375/km^{2})
Blount	Maryville	143,820	135,280	+6.31%	567 sq mi (1,470 km^{2})	254/sq mi (98/km^{2})
Anderson	Clinton	82,066	77,123	+6.41%	345 sq mi (890 km^{2})	238/sq mi (92/km^{2})
Loudon	Loudon	63,764	54,886	+16.18%	247 sq mi (640 km^{2})	258/sq mi (100/km^{2})
Roane	Kingston	57,395	53,404	+7.47%	395 sq mi (1,020 km^{2})	145/sq mi (56/km^{2})
Campbell	Jacksboro	40,290	39,272	+2.59%	498 sq mi (1,290 km^{2})	81/sq mi (31/km^{2})
Grainger	Rutledge	25,739	23,527	+9.40%	302 sq mi (780 km^{2})	85/sq mi (33/km^{2})
Morgan	Wartburg	22,160	21,035	+5.35%	522 sq mi (1,350 km^{2})	42/sq mi (16/km^{2})
Union	Maynardville	21,450	19,802	+8.32%	247 sq mi (640 km^{2})	87/sq mi (34/km^{2})
Total		968,137	903,300	+7.18%	3,379 sq mi (8,750 km^{2})	287/sq mi (111/km^{2})

Though sometimes considered to be part of the Knoxville metro area, the Census Bureau officially classifies Sevier County separately as the Sevierville micropolitan area, while Jefferson County is included in the Morristown metropolitan area. Grainger County was a part of both the Knoxville metropolitan and the Morristown metropolitan until 2023 when it was removed from the Morristown MSA.

The Knoxville MSA is the chief component of the larger Knoxville–Morristown-Sevierville, TN Combined Statistical Area (CSA), which also includes the Morristown metropolitan area (Hamblen, Jefferson, and Grainger counties) and the Sevierville (Sevier County) and Newport (Cocke County) Micropolitan statistical areas.

Historical population
Census	Pop.	Note	%±
1950	337,105		—
1960	400,335		18.8%
1970	433,675		8.3%
1980	505,070		16.5%
1990	534,917		5.9%
2000	616,079		15.2%
2010	837,571		36.0%
2020	903,300		7.8%
2023 (est.)	946,264		4.8%

=== History ===
U.S. federal government definitions of the Knoxville metropolitan area have varied over time. The metropolitan area was first defined in 1947 and consisted of Anderson, Blount and Knox counties. Union was added in 1970, and the area was renamed the Knoxville Standard Metropolitan Area. Grainger, Jefferson and Sevier counties were added in 1980, and it became the Knoxville Metropolitan Statistical Area. Grainger and Jefferson counties lost metropolitan status in 1990. Loudon County was added in 2000. Grainger County was re-added in 2013.

In new federal definitions of metropolitan areas announced in February 2013, the Knoxville Metropolitan Statistical Area was redefined. Campbell, Grainger, Morgan and Roane Counties were added to the MSA, making it a nine-county metropolitan region. Three of the four added counties were previously classified as components of the CSA, when Campbell and Roane counties were treated as the LaFollette and Harriman micropolitan areas, respectively, while Grainger County was part of the Morristown Metropolitan Statistical Area. Morgan County was not previously included in any metropolitan or micropolitan area, nor was it previously considered part of the CSA. The 2010 population of the redefined MSA was 837,571, making it 64th largest of MSAs in the United States.

The February 2013 announcement also included a new definition of the CSA associated with the Knoxville metropolitan area, renaming it the Knoxville–Morristown–Sevierville, TN Combined Statistical Area. In addition to the Knoxville MSA, the CSA includes the Morristown MSA and the Newport, Tennessee, and Sevierville Micropolitan Statistical Areas. The newly defined CSA consists of the same twelve counties as the previous CSA, plus Morgan County. As of 2010, the Knoxville CSA ranked as 51st largest in the United States with a 2010 census population of 1,077,073. It has an estimated 1,096,961 residents as of 2014, making it the 50th largest CSA.

== Knoxville economic area ==
As of 2004, the federal government's Bureau of Economic Analysis (BEA) identified the Knoxville Economic Area as consisting of the Knoxville–Sevierville–LaFollette CSA (as it was then defined) plus Bell County, Kentucky, and Claiborne, Hancock, Monroe, Morgan and Scott counties in Tennessee. BEA defines economic areas as metropolitan or micropolitan statistical areas that form regional centers of economic activity, plus the surrounding counties that are determined to be economically related to these centers of activity, based on a combination of census commuting data and newspaper circulation data supplied by the Audit Bureau of Circulations. The Knoxville Economic Area was one of 179 economic areas that the BEA identified in the United States as of 2004.

== Combined statistical area ==
The Knoxville–Morristown–Newport–Sevierville Combined Statistical Area consists of the following:

Knoxville–Morristown–Newport–Sevierville combined statistical area

=== Counties ===
- Anderson
- Blount
- Campbell
- Cocke
- Grainger
- Hamblen
- Jefferson
- Knox
- Loudon
- Morgan
- Roane
- Sevier
- Union

=== Communities ===
==== Places with more than 100,000 inhabitants ====
- Knoxville (Principal city)

==== Places with 10,000 to 33,000 inhabitants ====
- Alcoa
- Clinton
- Farragut
- Halls Crossroads (Census-designated place)
- Lenoir City
- Maryville
- Morristown (principal city)
- Oak Ridge
- Powell (Census-designated place)
- Sevierville (principal city)
- Seymour (Census-designated place)

==== Places with 1,000 to 10,000 inhabitants ====
- Bean Station
- Blaine
- Caryville
- Coalfield (census-designated place)
- Dandridge
- Eagleton Village (census-designated place)
- Fincastle (census-designated place)
- Gatlinburg
- Greenback
- Harriman
- Jacksboro
- Jefferson City
- Jellico
- Karns (census-designated place)
- Kingston
- LaFollette
- Luttrell
- Loudon
- Louisville
- Mascot (census-designated place)
- Maynardville
- Midtown (census-designated place)
- New Market
- Newport
- Norris
- Oliver Springs
- Pigeon Forge
- Plainview
- Rockwood
- Rocky Top
- Rutledge
- Strawberry Plains (census-designated place)
- Tellico Village (census-designated place)
- Vonore (Partial)
- Wears Valley (census-county division)
- Wildwood (census-designated place)
- White Pine

==== Places with less than 1,000 inhabitants ====
- Baneberry
- Fair Garden (census-designated place)
- Friendsville
- Oakdale
- Parrottsville
- Petros (census-designated place)
- Philadelphia
- Pittman Center
- Rarity Bay (census-designated place)
- Rockford
- Sunbright
- Townsend
- Walland (census-designated place)
- Wartburg

== See also ==
- List of micropolitan statistical areas
- Tennessee census statistical areas
