= Rarity Bay, Tennessee =

- Census-designated place
- Flag Logo

- Location within Tennessee Location within the United States
- Coordinates: 35°38′16″N 84°14′56″W
- Country: United States
- State: Tennessee
- Counties: Loudon; Monroe

Area
  - Total: 2.61 sq mi (6.75 km^{2})
  - Land: 1.82 sq mi (4.72 km^{2})
  - Water: 0.78 sq mi (2.02 km^{2})
- Elevation: 883 ft (269 m)

Population (2020)
  - Total: 885
  - Density: 485.3/sq mi (187.39/km^{2})
- Time zone: UTC-5 (Eastern (EST))
  - Summer (DST): UTC-4 (EDT)
- ZIP Code: 37885 (Vonore)
- Area code: 423
- FIPS code: 47-61635
- GNIS feature ID: 2805206

Rarity Bay is a golf course community and census-designated place (CDP) in Loudon and Monroe counties, Tennessee, United States. It was first listed as a CDP prior to the 2020 census. its population during the census was 885. It is in the southern part of Loudon County and the northern part of Monroe County, occupying a peninsula in Tellico Reservoir, with the Little Tennessee River to the southeast and the cove of Bat Creek to the northwest. Tennessee State Route 72 runs along the western edge of the CDP, leading south 2.5 miles (4.0 km) to U.S. Route 411 in Vonore and north 10 miles (16 km) to Loudon.

== Demographics ==
Historical population
Census	Pop.	Note	%±
2020	885		—
U.S. Decennial Census
