= Kahite, Tennessee =

- Census-designated place
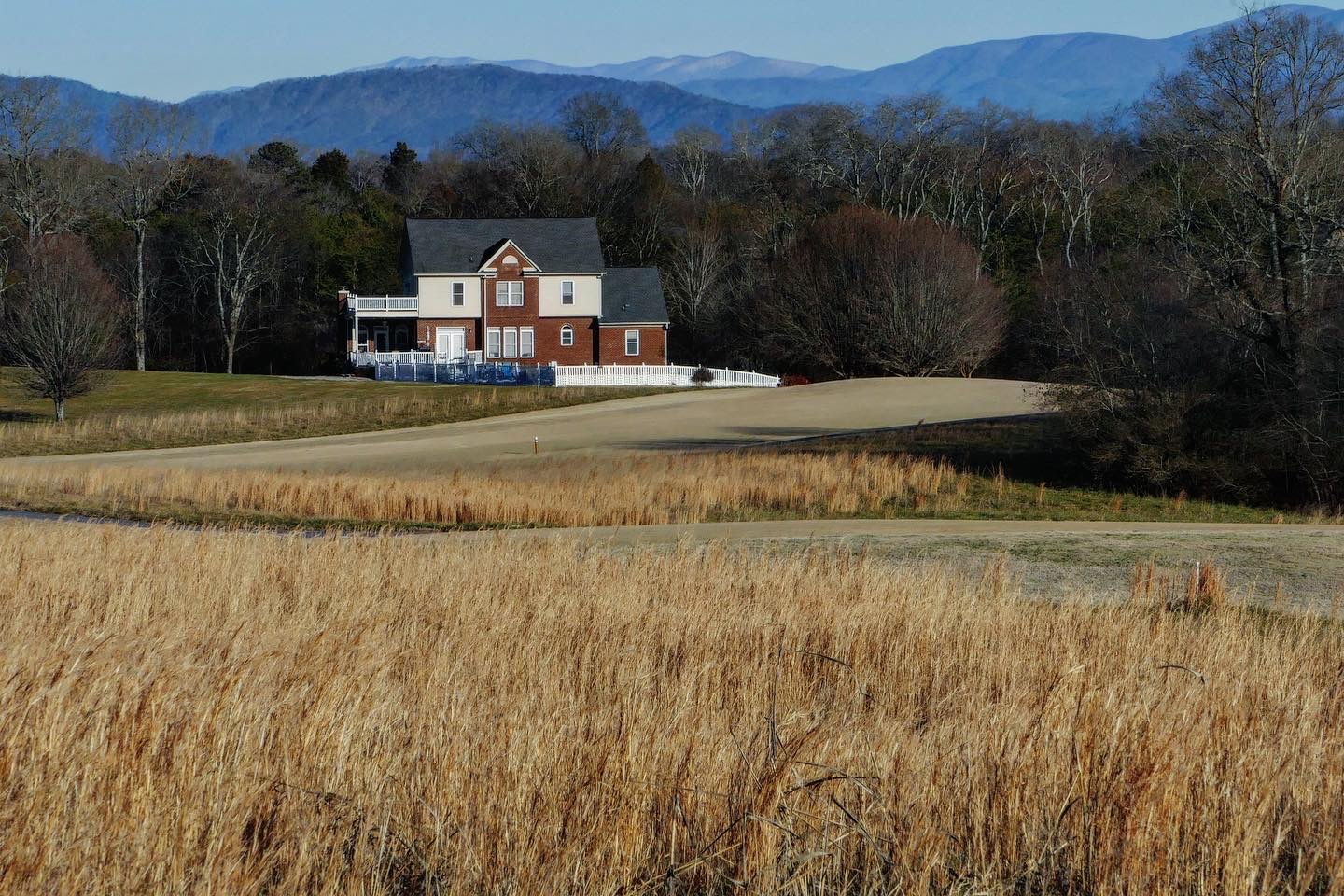
- Kahite, with the Great Smoky Mountains and Cherokee National Forest in the distance

- Location within Tennessee Location within the United States
- Coordinates: 35°34′09″N 84°14′09″W
- Country: United States
- State: Tennessee
- County: Monroe

Area
  - Total: 1.54 sq mi (4.00 km^{2})
  - Land: 1.30 sq mi (3.37 km^{2})
  - Water: 0.24 sq mi (0.63 km^{2})
- Elevation: 856 ft (261 m)

Population (2020)
  - Total: 834
  - Density: 641.7/sq mi (247.77/km^{2})
- Time zone: UTC-5 (Eastern (EST))
  - Summer (DST): UTC-4 (EDT)
- ZIP Code: 37885 (Vonore)
- Area code: 423
- FIPS code: 47-38765
- GNIS feature ID: 2805203

Kahite is an unincorporated community and census-designated place (CDP) in Monroe County, Tennessee, United States. It was first listed as a CDP prior to the 2020 census. its population was 834.

It is in the northern part of the county and is bordered on three sides by Tellico Reservoir: Corntassel Branch to the south, Fourmile Creek to the north, and the main stem of the Tellico River to the east. To the north, across Fourmile Creek, is the town of Vonore.

== Demographics ==
Historical population
Census	Pop.	Note	%±
2020	834		—
U.S. Decennial Census
