= Tennessee State Route 360 =

State highway in Tennessee, United States

State Route 360
- Unicoi Turnpike; Ballplay Road
- TN 360 highlighted in red

Route information
- Maintained by TDOT
- Length: 22.1 mi (35.6 km)
- Existed: July 1, 1983–present

Major junctions
- South end: SR 165 in Tellico Plains
- North end: US 411 / SR 72 in Vonore

Location
- Country: United States
- State: Tennessee
- Counties: Monroe

Highway system
- Tennessee State Routes; Interstate; US; State
| ← SR 359 | → SR 361 |

State Route 360 (SR 360) is a north–south state highway in Monroe County, Tennessee. It serves to connect Vonore with Fort Loudoun State Park, Cherohala Skyway, and Tellico Plains.

Between Tellico Plains and Ballplay, SR 360 is known as Ballplay Road, and between Ballplay and Vonore, it is known as Unicoi Turnpike.

== Route description ==
SR 360 begins in Tellico Plains at an intersection with SR 165 (Cherohala Skyway) just east of downtown. It immediately crosses a bridge over the Tellico River to leave Tellico Plains and wind its through mix of farmland and wooded areas as Ballplay Road. The highway then passes through a section of the Unicoi Mountains before passing through the community of Ballplay, where it makes a sharp right turn onto the Unicoi Turnpike. SR 360 continues to wind its way north through mountains to cross a section of Tellico Lake before turning northwest to pass through the community of Toqua and by various marinas along the banks of the lake. Unicoi Turnpike then crosses a bridge, which approaches a two-way intersection with Citico Road, where it makes a sharp left. It then crosses a Causeway over the lake to pass along an island, where it passes by Fort Loudoun State Park and the Sequoyah Birthplace Museum. It then crosses another causeway and bridge over the lake to enter Vonore and travels not even a mile before coming to an end at an intersection with US 411/SR 72 (SR 33) in a business district in the eastern part of town. The entire route of SR 360 is a two-lane highway and between Tellico Plains and Toqua, it travels along the western edge of the Cherokee National Forest.

== Major intersections ==
The entire route is in Monroe County.

| Location | mi | km | Destinations | Notes |
|---|---|---|---|---|
| Tellico Plains | 0.0 | 0.0 | SR 165 (Cherohala Skyway) – Downtown, Cherokee National Forest | Southern terminus |
| Tellico Plains | 0.07 | 0.11 | Bridge over the Tellico River | |
| | 20.23 | 32.56 | Bridge over Tellico Lake | |
| Fort Loudoun State Park | 21.16 | 34.05 | Fort Loudoun Road – Fort Loudoun State Park | Access road into park |
| Vonore | 21.44 | 34.50 | Bridge over Tellico Lake | |
| Vonore | 22.1 | 35.6 | US 411 / SR 72 (SR 33) – Madisonville, Loudon, Greenback, Maryville | Northern terminus |
1.000 mi = 1.609 km; 1.000 km = 0.621 mi
