= Hopewell Springs, Tennessee =

Unincorporated community in Tennessee, US

Coordinates: 35°31′46″N 84°16′10″W

Hopewell Springs is an unincorporated community in Monroe County, Tennessee, United States. It lies at an elevation of 850 feet (259 m).
