= Hopewell Mill, Tennessee =

Unincorporated community in Tennessee, US

Coordinates: 35°31′15″N 84°15′34″W

Hopewell Mill is an unincorporated community in Monroe County, Tennessee, United States. It lies at an elevation of 820 feet (250 m).
