= List of metropolitan areas of Tennessee =

Metropolitan Statistical Areas are, according to the University of Tennessee Knoxville as areas "centered around counties containing a census-defined urban area with a population of 50,000 or more."

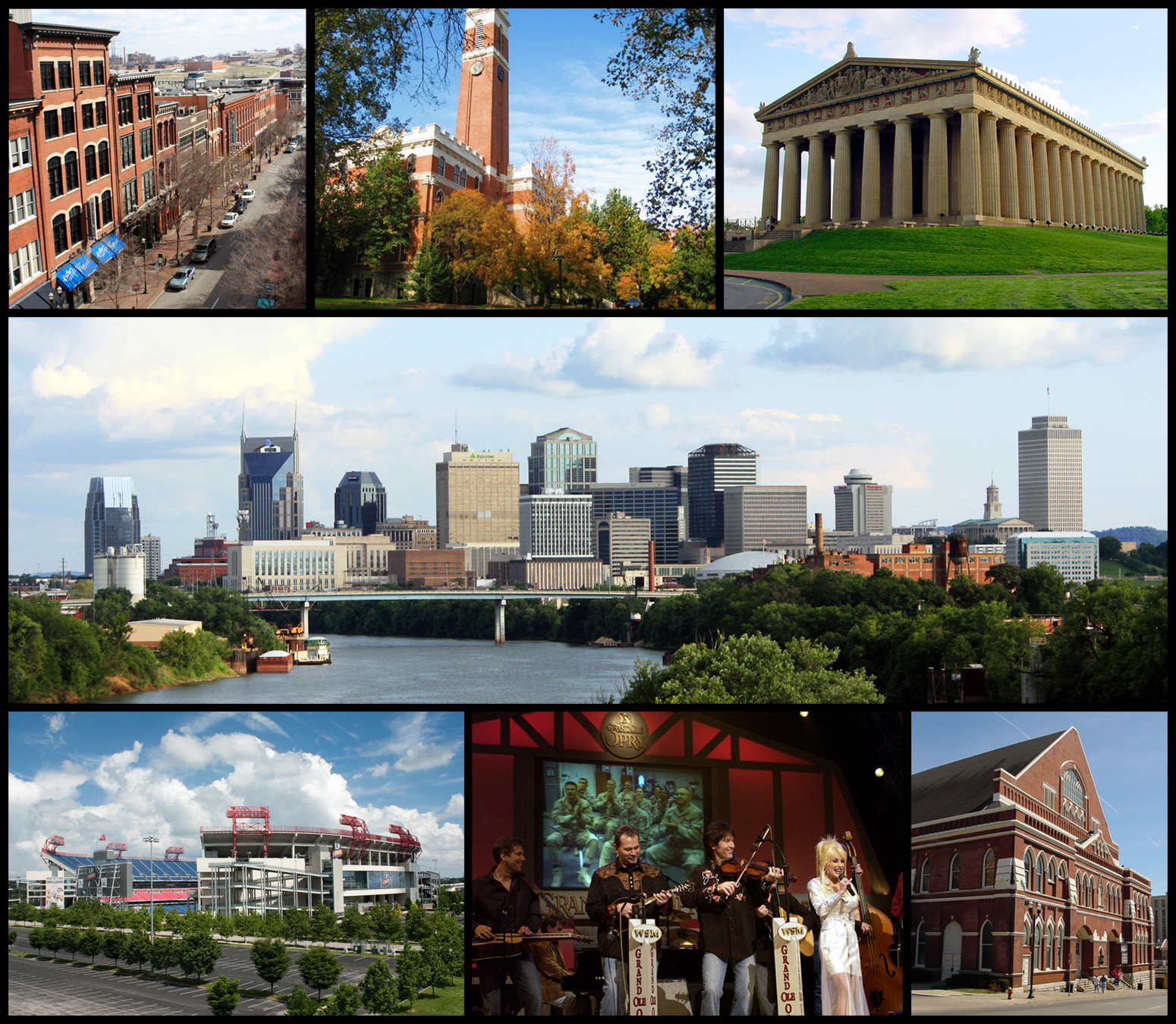
Nashville, largest metropolitan area

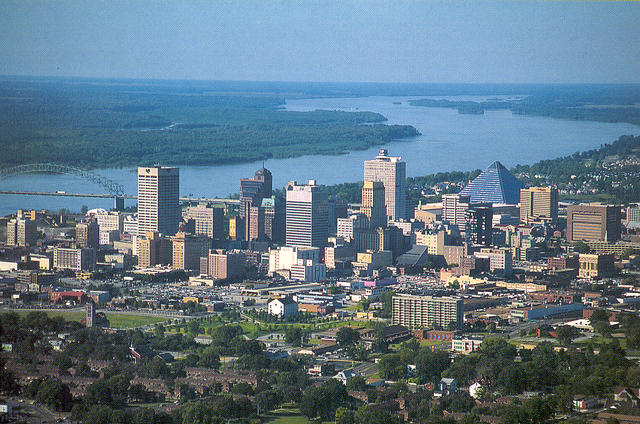
Memphis, second largest metropolitan area

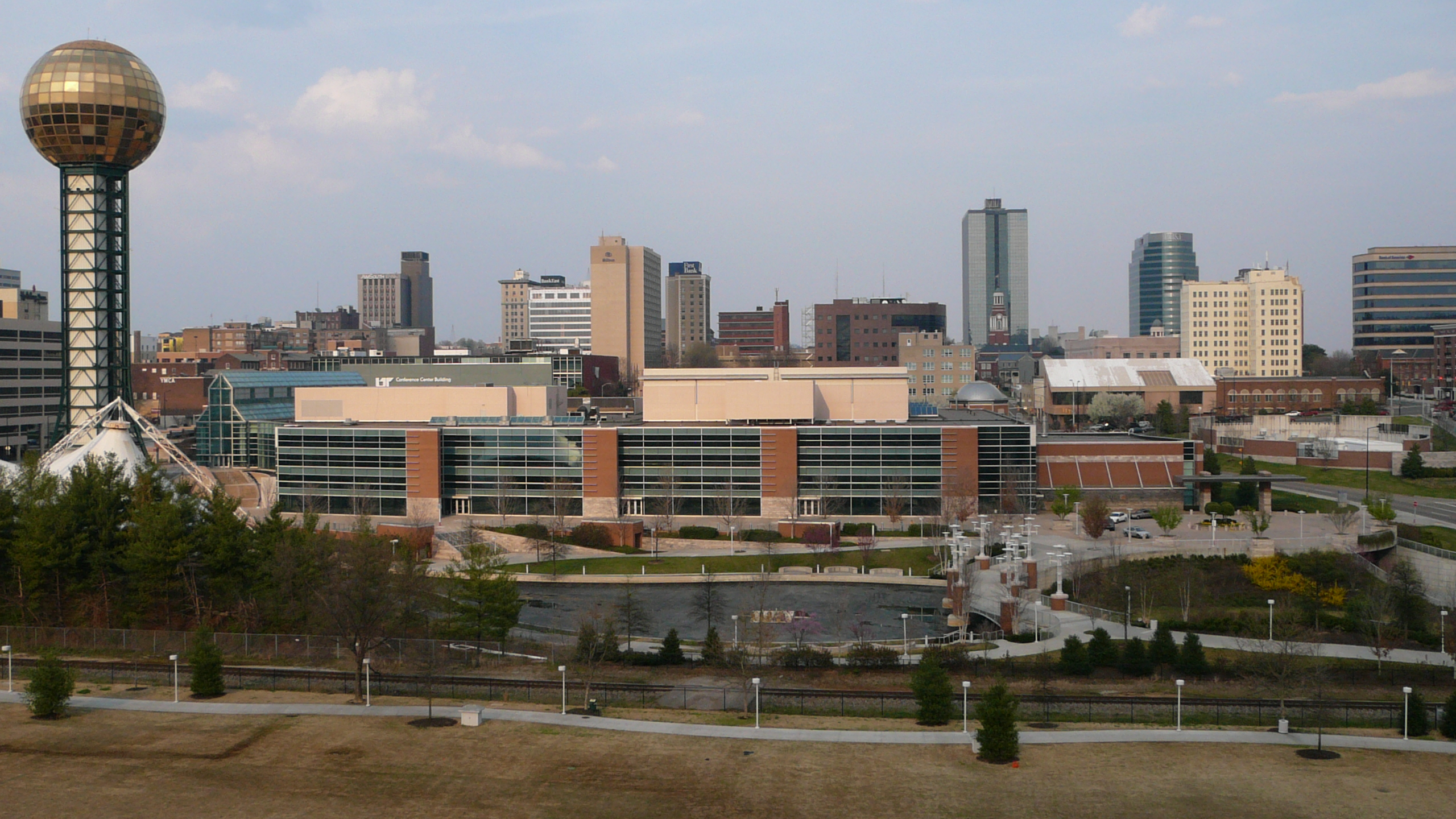
Knoxville, third largest metropolitan area

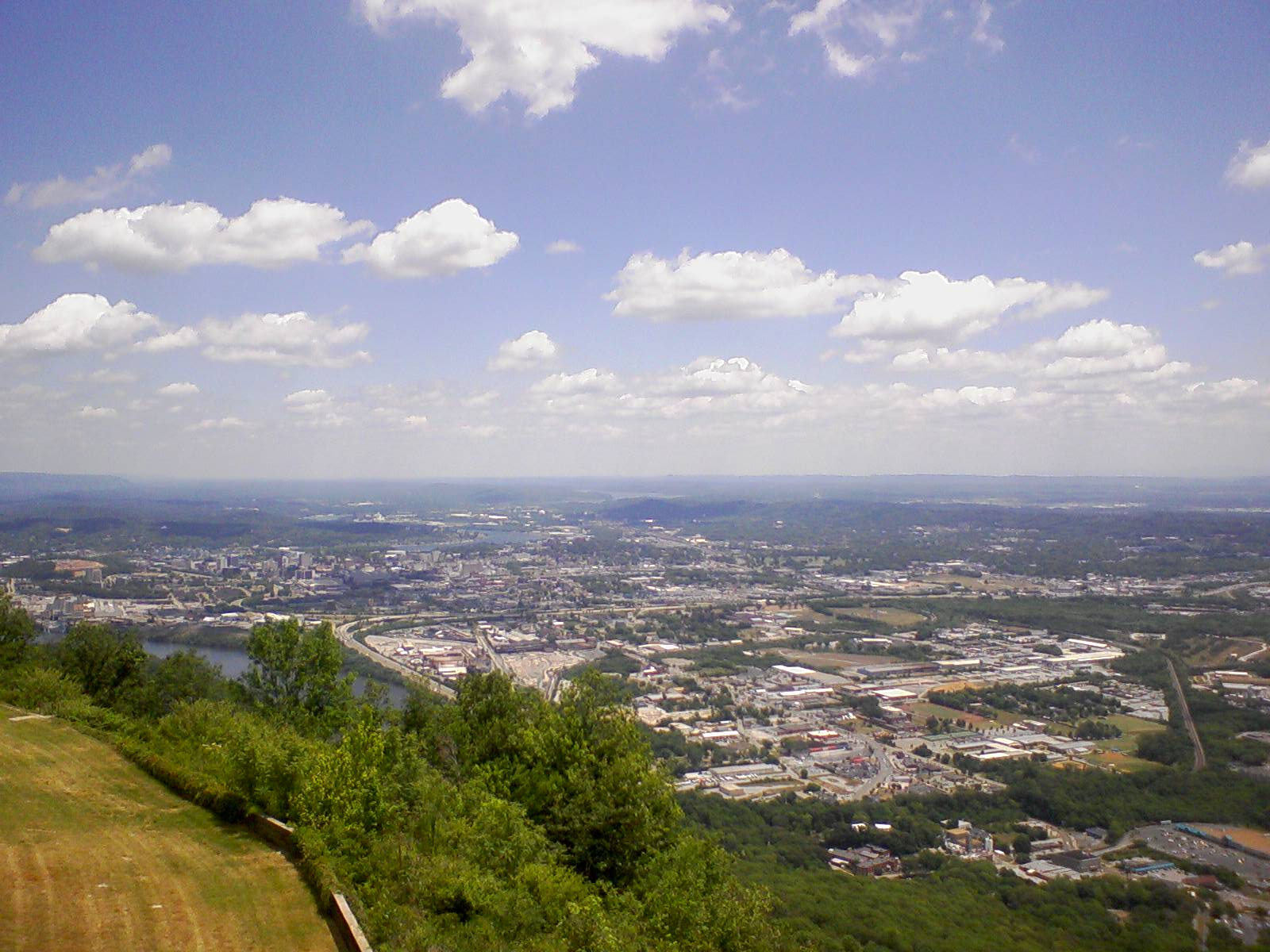
Chattanooga, fourth largest metropolitan area

Rank	Metropolitan area	Population 2019 estimates
1	Nashville	1,982,264
2	Memphis	1,324,926
3	Knoxville	869,046
4	Chattanooga	547,303
5	Kingsport–Bristol–Bristol	305,629
6	Clarksville	268,546
7	Johnson City	197,381
8	Morristown	137,612
9	Jackson	113,629
10	Cleveland	113,358
		5,246,895

Rank	Combined statistical area	Population 2009 estimates
1	Nashville-Davidson–Murfreesboro–Columbia	1,666,566
2	Knoxville-Morristown-Sevierville-La Follette	1,053,627
3	Chattanooga-Cleveland-Athens	690,400
4	Johnson City-Kingsport-Bristol	503,010
5	Jackson-Humboldt	163,097
6	Martin-Union City	71,704

== See also ==
- Table of United States Metropolitan Statistical Areas
- Table of United States Combined Statistical Areas
