= Tellico Village, Tennessee =

- Census-designated place
- Tellico Village
- Flag Logo

- Location of Tellico Village within Loudon County, Tennessee

- Location within the state of Tennessee
- Coordinates: 35°42′0″N 84°15′36″W
- Country: United States
- State: Tennessee
- County: Loudon
- Established: 1986

Government
  - Type: Homeowner association

Area
  - Total: 10.10 sq mi (26.16 km^{2})
  - Land: 7.46 sq mi (19.31 km^{2})
  - Water: 2.64 sq mi (6.85 km^{2})
- Elevation: 892 ft (272 m)

Population (2020)
  - Total: 7,311
  - Density: 980.6/sq mi (378.62/km^{2})
- Time zone: UTC-5 (Eastern (EST))
  - Summer (DST): UTC-4 (EDT)
- ZIP codes: 37774 and 37885
- Area codes: 865 and 423
- FIPS code: 47-73270
- GNIS feature ID: 2584594
- Website: Official website

Tellico Village is an unincorporated planned community, and census-designated place on the western shore of Tellico Reservoir in Loudon County, Tennessee, United States, about 30 miles (48 km) southwest of Knoxville. Its population was 5,791 as of the 2010 census and 7,311 at the 2020 census. Tellico Village is the second largest area by population in Loudon County behind Lenoir City.

Tellico Village is a planned retirement community. Governmental functions are managed by the Tellico Village Property Owners Association.

== Demographics ==
Historical population
Census	Pop.	Note	%±
2010	5,791		—
2020	7,311		26.2%
U.S. Decennial Census

=== 2020 census ===
As of the 2020 census, Tellico Village had a population of 7,311. The median age was 70.5 years. 2.3% of residents were under the age of 18 and 69.5% of residents were 65 years of age or older. For every 100 females there were 92.0 males, and for every 100 females age 18 and over there were 91.4 males age 18 and over.

97.9% of residents lived in urban areas, while 2.1% lived in rural areas.

There were 3,773 households in Tellico Village, of which 3.7% had children under the age of 18 living in them. Of all households, 74.0% were married-couple households, 7.8% were households with a male householder and no spouse or partner present, and 16.1% were households with a female householder and no spouse or partner present. About 20.6% of all households were made up of individuals and 16.4% had someone living alone who was 65 years of age or older.

There were 4,090 housing units, of which 7.8% were vacant. The homeowner vacancy rate was 0.8% and the rental vacancy rate was 20.5%.

Racial composition as of the 2020 census
Race	Number	Percent
White	7,037	96.3%
Black or African American	17	0.2%
American Indian and Alaska Native	11	0.2%
Asian	45	0.6%
Native Hawaiian and Other Pacific Islander	0	0.0%
Some other race	26	0.4%
Two or more races	175	2.4%
Hispanic or Latino (of any race)	96	1.3%

== History ==
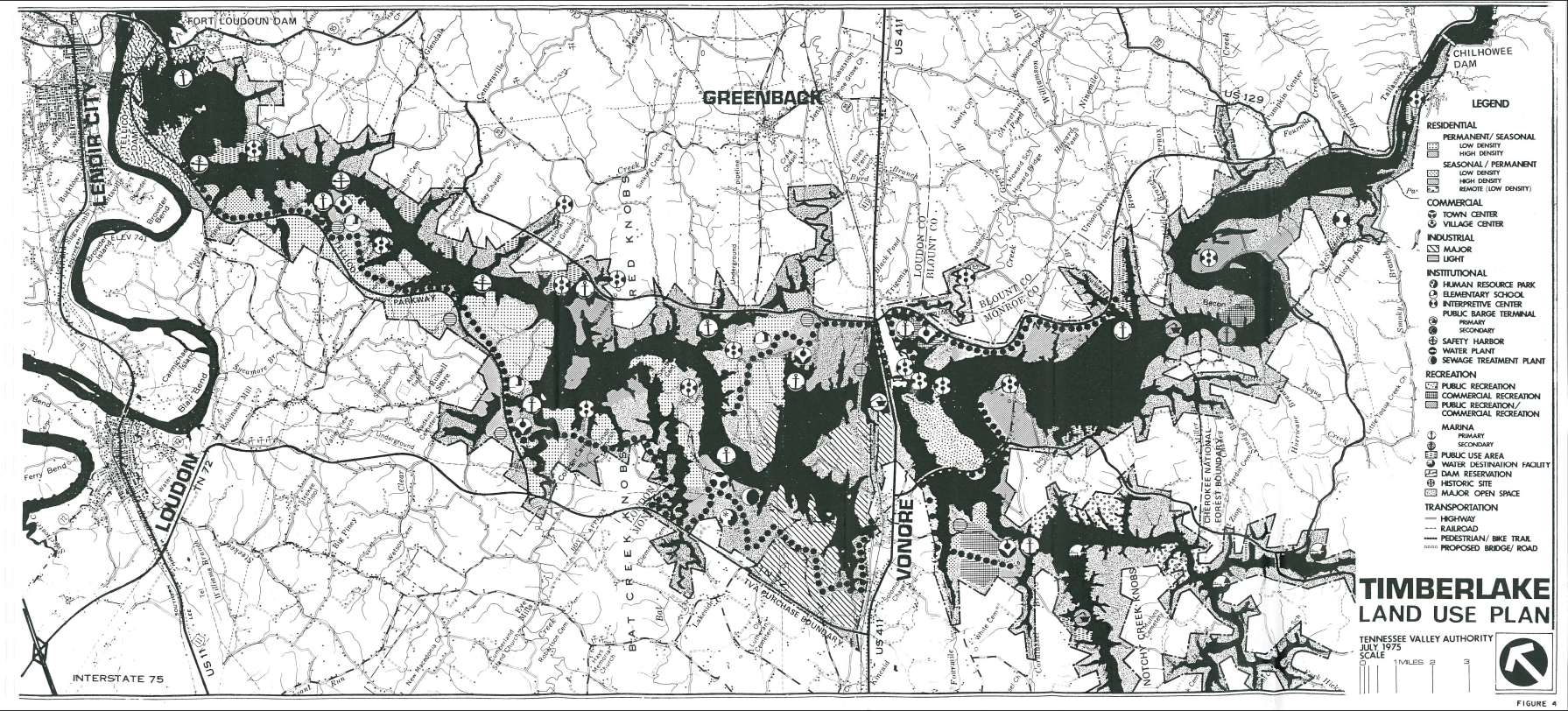
Considered one of the TVA's most ambitious projects, Timberlake, a planned city was proposed for the site that is now present-day Tellico Village

The origins of Tellico Village date back to the late 1960s with the plan known as Timberlake, a planned city that would have been located along the shores of the Tellico Reservoir in Loudon, Blount, and Monroe counties, and the communities of Tellico Village, Greenback, and Vonore. The city, would have been able to support a population base of roughly 30,000 residents, and provide employment opportunities with commercial and industrial developments.

Tellico Village was created along the shores of Tellico Lake, which was formed due to the Tennessee Valley Authority (TVA) damming the Little Tennessee River at its confluence with the Tennessee River. Tellico Dam was completed in November 1979 after a long battle, which involved the Endangered Species Act of 1973 and a fish called the snail darter. As part of the project, the TVA acquired additional land above the high water line of the reservoir (Tellico Lake), much of it taken by eminent domain. Part of this additional land was later sold to Cooper Communities, Inc., which established Tellico Village in 1986.

== Amenities ==
The community has three golf courses and a yacht and country club. The names of the golf courses, like the names of the streets and neighborhoods (each neighborhood within Tellico Village has its own name) are derived from American Indian words and names, mostly Cherokee. These include Toqua, meaning "fish," and Tanasi, which was the name of a town that was the capital of the Cherokee Nation between 1721 and 1730. "Tanasi" is also the word from which the name "Tennessee" was derived.

== Postal Service ==
The postal addresses for the community are Loudon (37774) and Vonore (37885), Tennessee.

Tellico Village did have a branch post office through a More Than Mail! store but the store's Postal service contract was terminated in November 2013. It operated for 15 years.

Another Contract Postal Unit (CPU) branch has since opened in Tellico Village inside Sloans Hardware.
