= Charles McClung McGhee =

American tycoon and financier (1828–1907)

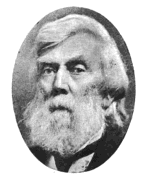
- Born: January 23, 1828; Monroe County, Tennessee, United States
- Died: May 5, 1907 (aged 79); Knoxville, Tennessee, United States
- Resting place: Old Gray Cemetery; Knoxville, Tennessee
- Occupation: Business
- Spouses: Isabella McNutt White; Cornelia Humes White
- Children: 6
- Parent(s): John McGhee and Betsey McClung
- Relatives: James White (great-grandfather); Charles McClung (grandfather); George W. Baxter (son-in-law); Lawrence Tyson (son-in-law); Charles McGhee Tyson (grandson)

Charles McClung McGhee (January 23, 1828 – May 5, 1907) was an American industrialist and financier, active primarily in Knoxville, Tennessee. As director of the East Tennessee, Virginia, and Georgia Railway (ETV&G), McGhee was responsible for much of the railroad construction that took place in East Tennessee in the 1870s and 1880s. His position with the railroad also gave him access to the northern capital markets, which he used to help finance dozens of companies in and around Knoxville. In 1885, he established the Lawson McGhee Library, which was the basis of Knox County's public library system.

Historian Lucile Deaderick wrote that "perhaps more than anyone else," McGhee "brought about and symbolized Knoxville which developed in the last third of the nineteenth century." A descendant of Knoxville's founders, McGhee established a pork packing operation during the Civil War. After the war, he formed a syndicate that bought and merged two railroads into the ETV&G, gained control of several other railroads, and financed a railroad construction boom that connected Knoxville to most of the eastern United States.

McGhee established one of Knoxville's first suburbs, McGhee's Addition (now Mechanicsville), in the late 1860s and cofounded Knoxville Woolen Mills in 1884, at the time the city's largest employer. He also helped finance the Roane Iron Company (which established Rockwood) and cofounded the Lenoir City Company (which established Lenoir City).

== Early life ==
McGhee was born near modern Vonore in Monroe County, Tennessee, the youngest son of John McGhee and Elizabeth "Betsy" McClung McGhee. His father was a wealthy planter of Scots-Irish descent who owned roughly 15,000 acres (6,100 ha) of land in the Little Tennessee River valley. His mother was the daughter of surveyor Charles McClung, who platted Knoxville in the early 1790s, and a granddaughter of Knoxville's founder, James White. McGhee spent much of his childhood moving back and forth between his father's plantation and Knoxville, where he spent a great deal of time with his mother's relatives. In 1846, he graduated from East Tennessee University. Upon his father's death, he and his brother, Barclay, inherited the family's plantation.

Around 1860, McGhee relocated permanently to Knoxville. At the outbreak of the Civil War, McGhee pledged his support for the Confederacy and agreed to supply the Confederate States Army with bacon and other pork products. He was given the rank of colonel on the army's commissary staff, and for the rest of his life, he was often referred to as "Colonel McGhee." Confederate diarist Ellen Renshaw House wrote that during the Union Army's occupation of Knoxville in 1863, McGhee gave her scarce fabric with which she and her friends sewed blankets for Confederate prisoners of war. Nevertheless, McGhee took the Oath of Allegiance, agreed to support the Union Army in 1864, and quickly mended ties with the city's Unionists. McGhee also assisted a couple that had been formerly enslaved by him, Handy and Evaline, and they took his last name as "he aided them materially in securing employment and starting them in life." Evaline McGhee died in Knoxville in 1905 at age 112.

== Railroads and other business interests ==
By the end of the war, McGhee had become one of Knoxville's leading businessmen. He helped establish the People's Bank in 1865 and was appointed the bank's president the following year. Around this time, McGhee and several associates organized a syndicate which purchased Knoxville's two main rail lines, the East Tennessee and Virginia Railroad and the East Tennessee and Georgia Railroad, and in 1869 merged the two into the ETV&G. As director of this railroad, McGhee became acquainted with numerous New York financiers, through which he gained funding for an acquisition of the Memphis and Charleston Railroad and the Knoxville and Kentucky Railroad. McGhee financed the extension of the latter to L&N lines in Ohio in 1883.

Using his access to northern capital markets, McGhee financed numerous business ventures in the 1870s and 1880s, often in partnership with his long-time associate, Edward J. Sanford. McGhee financed the creation of the Knoxville Street Rail Company in 1875, and in the early 1880s he secured $125,000 for the Roane Iron Company, which used the money to finance a massive steel-production operation. In 1884, McGhee and Sanford co-founded the Knoxville Woolen Mills, which by 1900 included a 4.5-acre (1.8 ha) plant and employed 600 workers. In 1889, McGhee and Sanford formed the Lenoir City Company and established Lenoir City, Tennessee, as a company town, which they hoped would grow into a manufacturing mecca.

During the 1880s, McGhee and Sanford gained control of the Coal Creek Mining and Manufacturing Company, which operated coal mines in eastern Anderson County. During the Coal Creek War of 1891–1892, McGhee and Sanford took a hardline stance against the miners, who were striking over the company's use of convict leasing. In letters to one another, McGhee and Sanford consistently complained about the state's ineffectiveness in handling the uprising.

In the late 1860s, McGhee established a suburb in northwestern Knoxville known as "McGhee's Addition" for the city's growing working and middle classes. Many of this suburb's early residents worked at the nearby Knoxville Woolen Mills or the Knoxville Iron Company (formed by McGhee's future Roane Iron associate, Hiram Chamberlain). Now known as Mechanicsville, the neighborhood was annexed by Knoxville in 1883.

In 1894, McGhee helped oversee the struggling ETV&G's transition into the Southern Railway, but he retired shortly afterward. He spent his later years travelling back and forth between his houses in Florida, Knoxville, and New York. On May 5, 1907, McGhee died of pneumonia and was interred in Old Gray Cemetery. The obelisk marking the McGhee family plot is among the tallest monuments in the cemetery.

== Legacy ==
McGhee was a well-known philanthropist in Knoxville in his later years. In 1875, he helped secure funding for Knoxville's St. John's Orphanage, which stood on Linden Street. In 1885, McGhee donated $50,000 for the establishment of the Lawson McGhee Library. Now part of the Knox County Public Library system, the building was named for McGhee's daughter, May Lawson McGhee, who had died suddenly in 1883. McGhee organized the library building so that its first floor could be rented out as commercial space and provide the library with a steady income.

McGhee's Knoxville mansion, built in 1872 at the corner of Locust Street and Union Avenue, was one of the first structures in the city designed by Joseph Baumann, whose architectural firm later designed many of the city's most prominent buildings. The mansion has been drastically modified to serve as a Masonic temple. McGhee's son-in-law, Lawrence Tyson, was a World War I general and United States senator. McGhee Tyson Airport is named for McGhee's grandson (Tyson's son), World War I pilot Charles McGhee Tyson (1889–1918).

== See also ==
- Eldad Cicero Camp
- Southern Terminal, Knoxville, Tennessee
