= Loudon County, Tennessee =

County in Tennessee, United States

- County
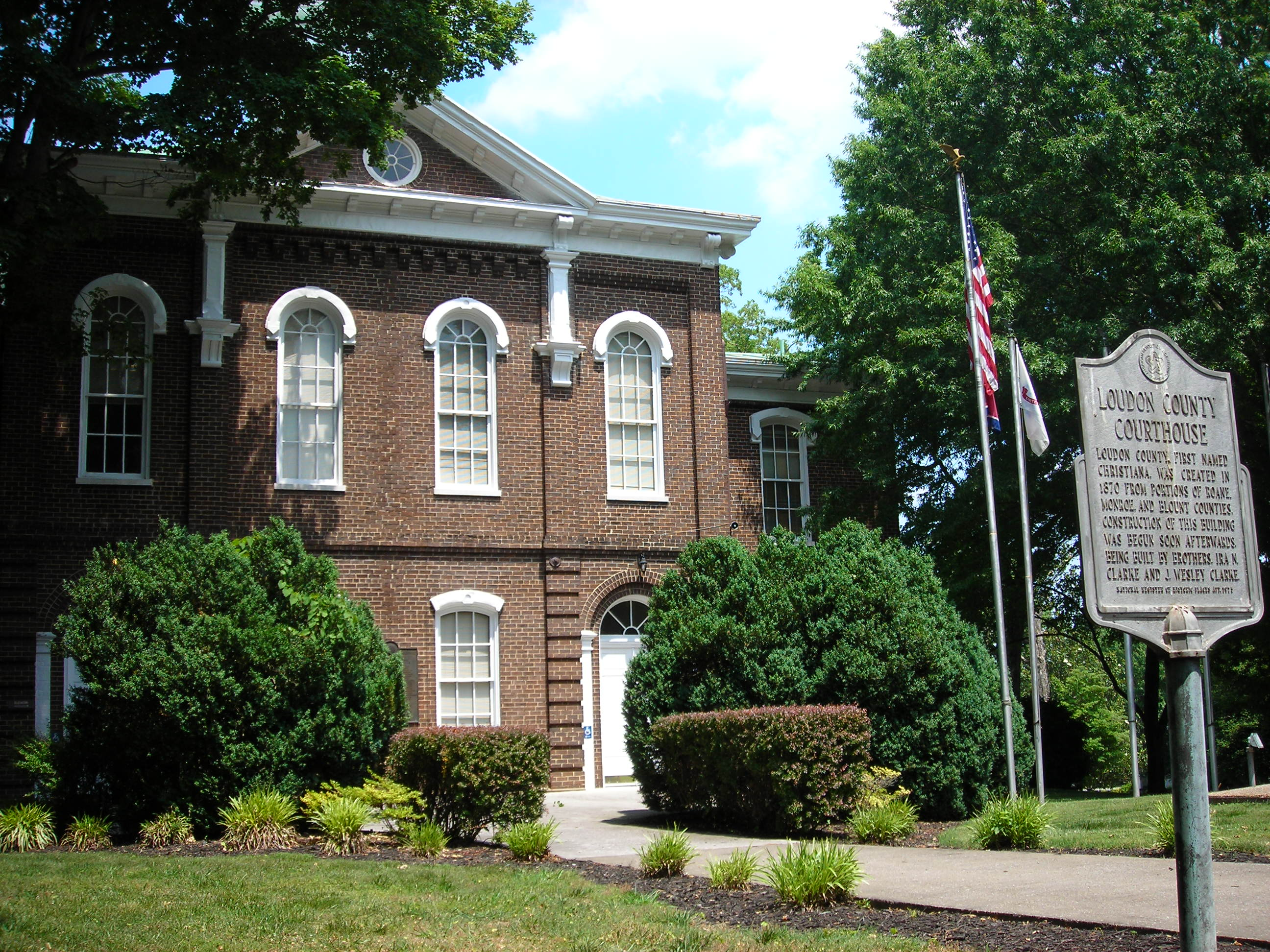
- The Loudon County Courthouse in Loudon

- Location within the U.S. state of Tennessee
- Coordinates: 35°44′N 84°19′W
- Country: United States
- State: Tennessee
- Founded: 1870
- Named for: Fort Loudoun
- Seat: Loudon
- Largest city: Lenoir City (population); Loudon (area)

Government
  - County Mayor: Rollen "Buddy" Bradshaw

Area
  - Total: 247 sq mi (640 km^{2})
  - Land: 229 sq mi (590 km^{2})
  - Water: 18 sq mi (47 km^{2}) 7.3%

Population (2020)
  - Total: 54,886
  - Estimate (2025): 63,764 ▲
  - Density: 240/sq mi (92.5/km^{2})
- Time zone: UTC−5 (Eastern)
  - Summer (DST): UTC−4 (EDT)
- Congressional district: 2nd
- Website: www.loudoncounty-tn.gov

Loudon County is a county in the U.S. state of Tennessee. It is located in the central part of East Tennessee. As of the 2020 census, the population was 54,886. Its county seat is Loudon. Loudon County is included in the Knoxville metropolitan area.

== History ==
Loudon County was formed on May 27, 1870, from portions of Roane, Monroe and Blount counties. Originally, it was named Christiana County, but a few days later the name was changed to Loudon in honor of nearby colonial-era Fort Loudoun. The fort was named for John Campbell, 4th Earl of Loudoun and a commander of British forces during the French and Indian Wars. In August 1870, the county officers were chosen. On September 5, 1870, the county court was organized at the Baptist Church in Loudon. This church became the temporary quarters of the county court until the new building, built by J. W. Clark & Brothers, was finished in 1872. Bussell Island, at the mouth of the Little Tennessee River, was inhabited by Native Americans for several thousand years before the arrival of the region's first European settlers. The Overhill Cherokee village of Mialoquo was located along the Little Tennessee near modern Tellico Village. Fort Loudoun was constructed by the British near modern Vonore in 1756, and was destroyed by the Cherokee four years later.

Loudon County was formed from parts of Roane, Monroe and Blount counties.

One of the earliest American settlements in what is now Loudon County was a river port and ferry known as Morganton, once located on the banks of the Little Tennessee River near modern Greenback. Morganton thrived during the early 19th century, but declined with the rise of the railroad in the latter half of the century. The town's remnants were inundated by Tellico Lake in the 1970s.

Lenoir City is rooted in a plantation established by William Ballard Lenoir in 1810, which by the 1850s included a railroad stop known as Lenoir Station. The Lenoir City Company, established by Knoxville financiers Charles McClung McGhee and Edward J. Sanford, platted modern Lenoir City in the 1890s.

The town of Loudon began as a ferry and later steamboat stop known as Blair's Ferry, established by James Blair and his brother-in-law, John Hudson Carmichael, in the 1810s. The town changed its name to "Loudon" during the early 1850s, when it expanded following the arrival of the railroad. The railroad bridge at Loudon was one of eight bridges targeted for destruction by Union guerillas as part of the East Tennessee bridge-burning conspiracy in November 1861, at the outset of the Civil War. The bridge was too well-guarded by Confederate sentries, however, and the guerillas abandoned the effort.

== Geography ==
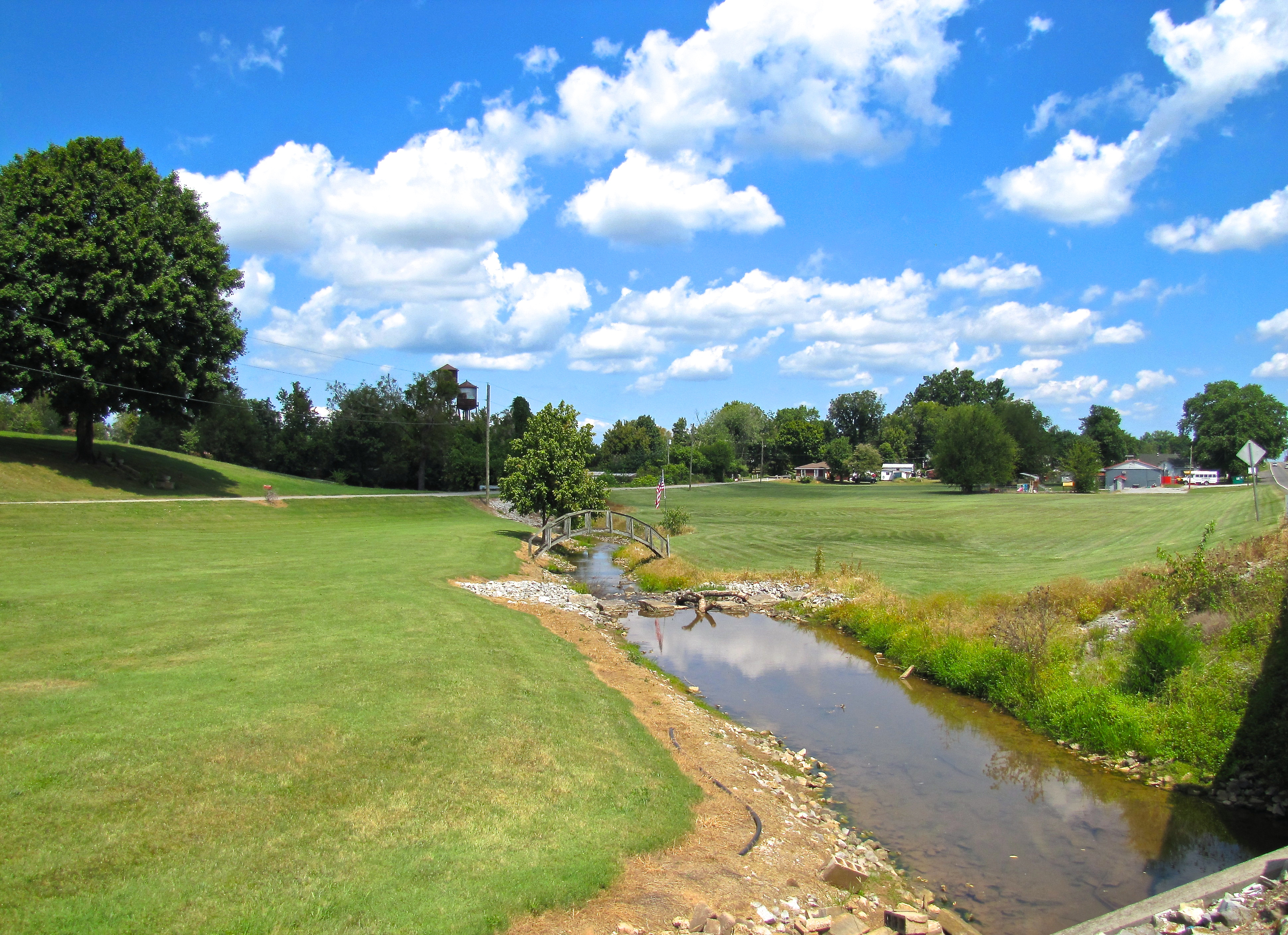
Creek in Philadelphia

According to the U.S. Census Bureau, the county has a total area of 247 square miles (640 km^{2}), of which 229 square miles (590 km^{2}) is land and 18 square miles (47 km^{2}) (7.3%) is water.

The Little Tennessee River joins the Tennessee River at Lenoir City. The lower part of the Little Tennessee River is part of Tellico Lake, created by Tellico Dam near the mouth of the river. Fort Loudoun Dam spans the Tennessee River just upstream from its confluence with the Little Tennessee, creating Fort Loudoun Lake. The section of the river downstream from Fort Loudoun Dam is part of Watts Bar Lake.

=== Adjacent counties ===
- Knox County (northeast)
- Blount County (east)
- Monroe County (south)
- McMinn County (southwest)
- Roane County (northwest)

=== State protected areas ===
- Tellico Lake Wildlife Management Area (part)

== Demographics ==
Historical population
Census	Pop.	Note	%±
1880	9,148		—
1890	9,273		1.4%
1900	10,838		16.9%
1910	13,612		25.6%
1920	16,275		19.6%
1930	17,805		9.4%
1940	19,838		11.4%
1950	23,182		16.9%
1960	23,757		2.5%
1970	24,266		2.1%
1980	28,553		17.7%
1990	31,255		9.5%
2000	39,086		25.1%
2010	48,556		24.2%
2020	54,886		13.0%
2025 (est.)	63,764	▲	16.2%
U.S. Decennial Census; 1790-1960 1900-1990; 1990-2000 2010-2014

=== Racial and ethnic composition ===
Loudon County, Tennessee – Racial and ethnic composition Note: the US Census treats Hispanic/Latino as an ethnic category. This table excludes Latinos from the racial categories and assigns them to a separate category. Hispanics/Latinos may be of any race.
Race / Ethnicity (NH = Non-Hispanic)	Pop 1980	Pop 1990	Pop 2000	Pop 2010	Pop 2020	% 1980	% 1990	% 2000	% 2010	% 2020
White alone (NH)	27,923	30,668	37,210	43,776	46,419	97.79%	98.12%	95.20%	90.16%	84.57%
Black or African American alone (NH)	419	400	440	517	578	1.47%	1.28%	1.13%	1.06%	1.05%
Native American or Alaska Native alone (NH)	35	52	114	111	95	0.12%	0.17%	0.29%	0.23%	0.17%
Asian alone (NH)	33	49	83	284	450	0.12%	0.16%	0.21%	0.58%	0.82%
Native Hawaiian or Pacific Islander alone (NH)	x	x	5	22	2	x	x	0.01%	0.05%	0.00%
Other race alone (NH)	1	3	13	27	161	0.00%	0.01%	0.03%	0.06%	0.29%
Mixed race or Multiracial (NH)	x	x	327	424	1,825	x	x	0.84%	0.87%	3.33%
Hispanic or Latino (any race)	142	83	894	3,395	5,356	0.50%	0.27%	2.29%	6.99%	9.76%
Total	28,553	31,255	39,086	48,556	54,886	100.00%	100.00%	100.00%	100.00%	100.00%

=== 2020 census ===
As of the 2020 census, the county had a population of 54,886 residents and the median age was 50.0 years. 18.6% of residents were under the age of 18 and 28.0% of residents were 65 years of age or older. For every 100 females there were 96.3 males, and for every 100 females age 18 and over there were 94.5 males age 18 and over.

The racial makeup of the county was 86.3% White, 1.1% Black or African American, 0.4% American Indian and Alaska Native, 0.8% Asian, <0.1% Native Hawaiian and Pacific Islander, 5.4% from some other race, and 6.1% from two or more races. Hispanic or Latino residents of any race comprised 9.8% of the population.

64.3% of residents lived in urban areas, while 35.7% lived in rural areas.

There were 22,698 households in the county, of which 24.0% had children under the age of 18 living in them. Of all households, 58.8% were married-couple households, 14.9% were households with a male householder and no spouse or partner present, and 21.4% were households with a female householder and no spouse or partner present. About 23.8% of all households were made up of individuals and 12.9% had someone living alone who was 65 years of age or older.

There were 24,559 housing units, of which 7.6% were vacant. Among occupied housing units, 79.0% were owner-occupied and 21.0% were renter-occupied. The homeowner vacancy rate was 1.3% and the rental vacancy rate was 7.0%.

=== 2022 American Community Survey ===
Approximately 30,449 people were native to the state.

=== 2010 census ===
As of the census of 2010, there were 48,556 people, 19,826 households, and 14,483 families living in the county. The population density was 212.03 persons per square mile (81.87 persons/km^{2}). The housing unit density was 86.58 units per square mile (33.43/km^{2}). The racial makeup of the county was 95.35% White, 1.11% African American, 0.28% Native American, 0.59% Asian, 0.10% Pacific Islander, and 1.08% from two or more races. 6.99% were Hispanic or Latino of any race.

Of the 19,826 households, 23.52% had children under the age of 18 living in them, 60.10% were married couples, 4.13% had a male householder with no wife present, 8.82% had a female householder with no husband present, and 16.95% were non-families. 23.21% were one person and 11.17% were one person aged 65 or older. The average household size was 2.42 and the average family size was 2.82.

The age distribution was 20.32% under the age of 18, 58.19% ages 18 to 64, and 21.49% age 65 and older. The median age was 46.0 years. 50.93% of the population were females and 49.07% were males.

The median household income in the county was $49,343, and the median family income was $59,044. Males had a median income of $44,110, versus $29,441 for females. The per capita income for the county was $27,046. About 9.2% of families and 13.8% of the population were below the poverty line, including 23.8% of those under the age of 18 and 6.8% of those age 65 and over.

=== 2000 census ===
At the 2000 census there were 39,086 people, 15,944 households, and 11,798 families living in the county. The population density was 171 people per square mile (66 people/km^{2}). There were 17,277 housing units at an average density of 76 units per square mile (29/km^{2}). The racial makeup of the county was 95.90% White, 1.14% Black or African American, 0.32% Native American, 0.21% Asian, 0.02% Pacific Islander, 1.43% from other races, and 0.98% from two or more races. 2.29% of the population were Hispanic or Latino of any race. Of the 15,944 households 28.40% had children under the age of 18 living with them, 61.70% were married couples living together, 8.90% had a female householder with no husband present, and 26.00% were non-families. 22.80% of households were one person and 10.10% were one person aged 65 or older. The average household size was 2.42 and the average family size was 2.82.

The age distribution was 21.90% under the age of 18, 6.70% from 18 to 24, 27.50% from 25 to 44, 27.70% from 45 to 64, and 16.20% 65 or older. The median age was 41 years. For every 100 females, there were 95.10 males. For every 100 females age 18 and over, there were 92.10 males.

The median household income was $40,401 and the median family income was $46,517. Males had a median income of $33,567 versus $23,164 for females. The per capita income for the county was $21,061. About 6.90% of families and 10.00% of the population were below the poverty line, including 12.80% of those under age 18 and 9.00% of those age 65 or over.

== Education ==
The public schools in all areas of the county except Lenoir City are operated by Loudon County Schools.

=== Loudon County Schools ===
- Loudon High School
- Greenback School (K–12)
- Fort Loudoun Middle School
- North Middle School
- Eaton Elementary School
- Highland Park Elementary School
- Loudon Elementary School
- Philadelphia Elementary School
- Steekee Elementary School
- Loudon County Technology Center

=== Lenoir City Schools ===
- Lenoir City High School
- Lenoir City Intermediate/Middle School
- Lenoir City Elementary School

== Communities ==
=== Cities ===
- Greenback
- Lenoir City
- Loudon (County Seat)
- Philadelphia

=== Towns ===
- Farragut (partial)

=== Census-designated place ===
- Rarity Bay (partly in Monroe Co.)
- Tellico Village

=== Unincorporated communities ===
- Dixie Lee Junction
- Unitia

== Politics ==
Loudon County has long been a Republican stronghold in presidential elections. It has voted Republican in all but one presidential election since 1916, with the sole exception being 1976 when Jimmy Carter narrowly won the county.

United States presidential election results for Loudon County, Tennessee
Year	Republican		Democratic		Third party(ies)	
Year	No.	%	No.	%	No.	%
1912	322	29.51%	415	38.04%	354	32.45%
1916	698	62.10%	423	37.63%	3	0.27%
1920	1,872	72.70%	686	26.64%	17	0.66%
1924	1,533	66.59%	703	30.54%	66	2.87%
1928	2,127	78.23%	589	21.66%	3	0.11%
1932	1,817	51.87%	1,629	46.50%	57	1.63%
1936	2,343	51.99%	2,146	47.61%	18	0.40%
1940	2,226	51.56%	2,068	47.90%	23	0.53%
1944	3,147	65.74%	1,632	34.09%	8	0.17%
1948	2,605	57.70%	1,673	37.05%	237	5.25%
1952	4,311	66.52%	2,138	32.99%	32	0.49%
1956	4,583	60.91%	2,844	37.80%	97	1.29%
1960	5,356	65.47%	2,722	33.27%	103	1.26%
1964	4,148	55.21%	3,365	44.79%	0	0.00%
1968	4,299	54.58%	1,581	20.07%	1,996	25.34%
1972	5,357	75.12%	1,604	22.49%	170	2.38%
1976	4,458	48.28%	4,683	50.72%	92	1.00%
1980	6,382	61.51%	3,699	35.65%	295	2.84%
1984	7,113	68.36%	3,227	31.01%	65	0.62%
1988	7,122	66.69%	3,480	32.59%	77	0.72%
1992	6,444	47.70%	5,414	40.07%	1,652	12.23%
1996	7,097	51.69%	5,552	40.44%	1,081	7.87%
2000	10,266	62.57%	5,905	35.99%	235	1.43%
2004	14,041	70.69%	5,708	28.74%	115	0.58%
2008	15,815	71.29%	6,058	27.31%	311	1.40%
2012	16,707	75.69%	5,058	22.91%	308	1.40%
2016	17,610	75.29%	4,919	21.03%	862	3.69%
2020	21,713	73.99%	6,948	23.68%	686	2.34%
2024	25,226	75.96%	7,625	22.96%	358	1.08%

== See also ==
- National Register of Historic Places listings in Loudon County, Tennessee
