= Fort Loudoun State Historic Park =

State park in Tennessee, United States

Coordinates: 35°35′35″N 84°12′45″W

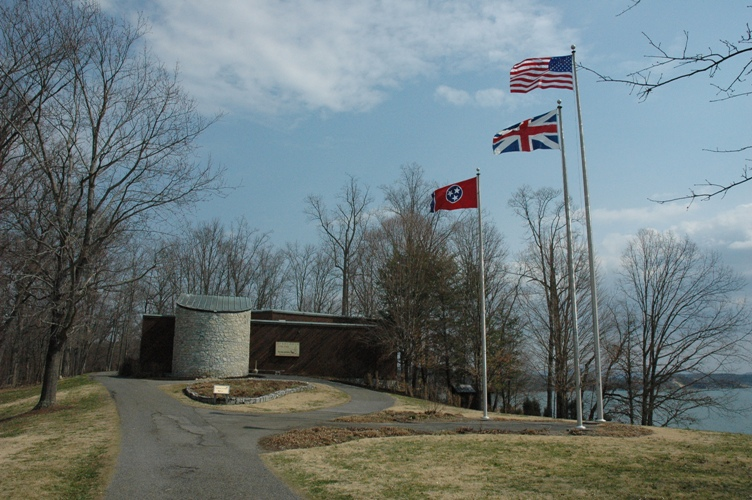
- Fort Loudoun State Historic Area visitor center
- Interactive map of Fort Loudoun State Historic Park
- Type: Tennessee State Park
- Location: Vonore, Tennessee
- Area: 1,200 acres (4.9 km^{2})
- Created: 1970s
- Open: Year round
- Website: Fort Loudoun State Historic Park

Fort Loudoun State Historic Park is a state park in Monroe County in the U.S. state of Tennessee. Established in 1977, it houses the reconstructed Fort Loudoun along with an interpretive center and recreation area. Park staff also maintain the nearby Tellico Blockhouse site.

The state park is located off State Route 360 south of Vonore.

== Activities and amenities ==
Along with the reconstructed fort, the park has a visitors center and museum, and one picnic shelter/pavilion.

- Hiking: There are three hiking trails in the park.
- Fishing: Fishing is available in the park on Tellico Lake.
- Birding is a popular activity in the park.
- A museum is present near the main parking lot.
- A full-scale, reconstructed fort, with occasional reenactments is present behind the main museum building.
- A gift shop, complete with t-shirts, CDs, and children's toys, is located in the museum.
- A rental pavilion is available.
