= Midway, Roane County, Tennessee =

Midway
- Unincorporated community
- Location within Tennessee Location within the United States
- Coordinates: 35°46′34″N 84°33′06″W
- Country: United States
- State: Tennessee
- County: Roane
- Elevation: 869 ft (265 m)
- Time zone: UTC-5 (Eastern (EST))
  - Summer (DST): UTC-4 (EDT)
- Area code: 865
- GNIS feature ID: 1315499

Midway is an unincorporated community in Roane County, Tennessee, United States. Midway is located on Tennessee State Route 72 (Loudon Highway) 7.6 miles (12.2 km) south-southwest of Kingston. Midway does contain three schools: Midway Elementary School, Midway Middle School, and Midway High School.
