= Paint Rock, Tennessee =

- Unincorporated community
- Location within Tennessee Location within the United States
- Coordinates: 35°44′39″N 84°30′53″W
- Country: United States
- State: Tennessee
- County: Roane
- Elevation: 787 ft (240 m)
- Time zone: UTC-6 (Central (CST))
  - Summer (DST): UTC-5 (CDT)
- GNIS feature ID: 1296662

Paint Rock is an unincorporated community in Roane County, Tennessee, United States.

In 1876, Paint Rock contained a post office, grist mill, saw mill, school, two churches, and a population of approximately 100.

A station of the South Roane County Volunteer Fire Department is located in Paint Rock.
