= Monroe County, Tennessee =

County in Tennessee, United States

- County
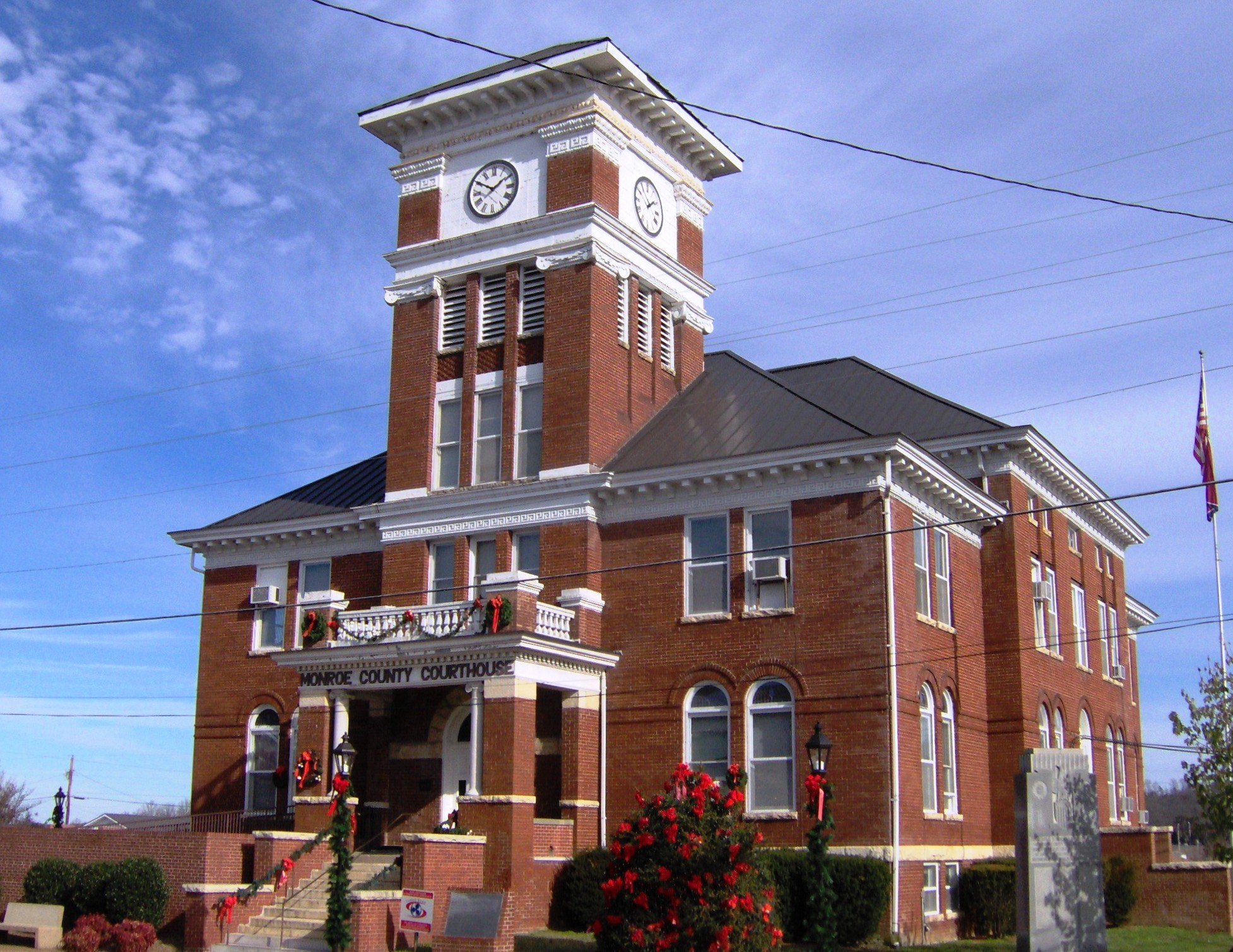
- Monroe County Courthouse in Madisonville

- Location within the U.S. state of Tennessee
- Coordinates: 35°27′N 84°15′W
- Country: United States
- State: Tennessee
- Founded: November 13, 1819
- Named for: James Monroe
- Seat: Madisonville
- Largest city: Sweetwater

Government
  - Mayor: Mitch Ingram (R)

Area
  - Total: 653 sq mi (1,690 km^{2})
  - Land: 636 sq mi (1,650 km^{2})
  - Water: 17 sq mi (44 km^{2}) 2.6%

Population (2020)
  - Total: 46,250
  - Estimate (2025): 49,730 ▲
  - Density: 72.7/sq mi (28.1/km^{2})
- Time zone: UTC−5 (Eastern)
  - Summer (DST): UTC−4 (EDT)
- Congressional district: 3rd
- Website: www.monroetn.com

Monroe County is a county located on the eastern border of the U.S. state of Tennessee. As of the 2020 census, its population was 46,250. Its county seat is Madisonville, and its largest city is Sweetwater.

== History ==
During the early part of the 18th century, the area around what is now Monroe County was known as part of the traditional homelands of the Overhill Cherokee, a western subset of the Cherokee Nation. They had established towns and villages extending through much of the mountainous areas of western Virginia, the Carolinas, southeastern Tennessee, and portions of northeastern Georgia and Alabama. English colonists and European Americans tended to refer to these areas by geography: Lower Towns, along the upper Savannah River in South Carolina; Middle Towns in Western North Carolina west of the French Broad River; and the Overhill Towns, located generally along the west side of the Appalachian Mountains in present-day Tennessee, along the lower Little Tennessee River and upper Tennessee River; south into northeastern Georgia. Later, the Cherokee expanded into western Georgia and what developed as Alabama.

The Overhill Towns had developed along the Little Tennessee and Tellico Rivers throughout present-day Monroe County, Tennessee. These included Chota, Tanasi (the name source of "Tennessee"), and Great Tellico, which at various times were each considered the Cherokee principal town or "mother town". Also in this area were Citico, Toqua, Tomotley, Mialoquo, Chilhowee, and Tallassee.

Archaeological excavations at the Citico site suggest the area was inhabited for thousands of years before the arrival of European settlers. Artifacts uncovered from the Icehouse Bottom site near Vonore date to as early as 7500 BC, during the Archaic period. Later prehistoric occupants were from indigenous cultures, such as the Woodland era and Southern Appalachia Mississippian culture that preceded the rise of the historic Cherokee people. The latter group is believed to have migrated south from the Great Lakes area around 1000 CE or later.

They spoke an Iroquoian language, and most other Iroquoian tribes have historically occupied areas around the Great Lakes, including the powerful Five Nations of the Iroquois League, or Haudenosaunee, then based in present-day New York and Pennsylvania. The Tuscarora people of the Carolinas also spoke an Iroquoian language, and are believed to have come south. Following the disasters of the Yamasee War in the early 1700s, they decided to leave and migrated north, declaring the tribal migration complete in 1722 and settling near the Oneida people in western New York.

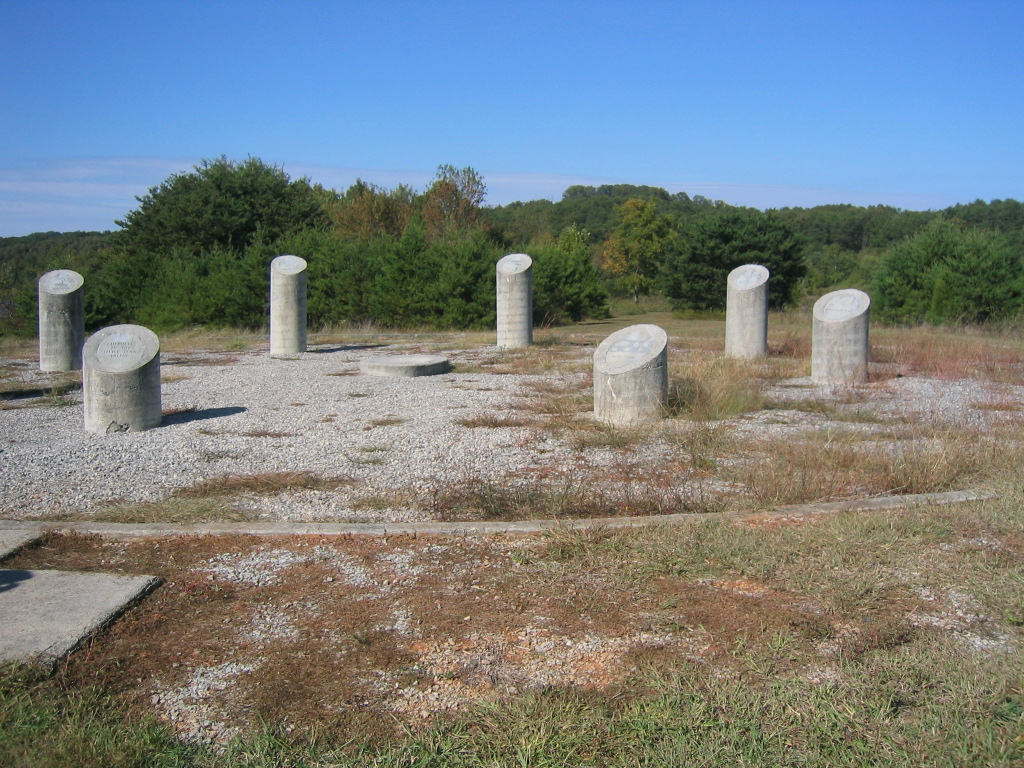
Chota Memorial

In 1756, during the French and Indian War (the North American front of the Seven Years' War), the British established Fort Loudoun on the Little Tennessee River near its confluence with the Tellico River, as part of an agreement with the Cherokee to gain support of their warriors. After relations soured between the British and Cherokee in 1760, when South Carolina authorities killed several Cherokee chiefs held prisoner in the colony, the Cherokee laid siege to Fort Loudoun. They killed two dozen of its garrison after their surrender in August 1760, and took many survivors captive for ransom. The British retaliated, attacking the Cherokee Lower Towns and Middle Towns in the Carolinas.

Monroe County was established in 1819 after the signing of the Calhoun Treaty, in which the Cherokee ceded to the United States claims to lands stretching from the Little Tennessee River south to the Hiwassee River. The county was named for James Monroe, the fifth President of the United States. The Cherokee migrated south and west, deeper into Georgia and Alabama.

Some of the state's first gold mines were located in Monroe County. In the early 1830s, placer mining was conducted on Coker Creek (near Tellico Plains).

Monroe County was one of the few East Tennessee counties to support secession at the outbreak of the American Civil War; others in the area supported the Union. On June 8, 1861, the county voted in favor of Tennessee's Ordinance of Secession by a margin of 1,096 to 774.

In the early 20th century, the Babcock Lumber Company conducted extensive logging operations in the Tellico Plains area. During the same period, the Aluminum Company of America began building a string of dams along the Little Tennessee, among them Calderwood, Santeetlah, and Cheoah, to harness water power for its aluminum-smelting operations in nearby Alcoa.

After a construction program for flood control and generating hydroelectric power beginning in the 1930s, the Tennessee Valley Authority planned construction in the 1960s of its last major project: Tellico Dam, completed in 1979. It was intended for flood control, the generation of hydroelectric power, and recreation related to creation of the manmade, large Tellico Reservoir. This water body flooded the lower 33 miles of the Little Tennessee River. Although the project had been opposed by many residents in the county, where several communities had to be abandoned and landowners relocated before the flooding, others supported the project. In the environmental analysis, the project was found to threaten an endangered species. The snail darter controversy delayed completion of the dam for some time.

== Geography ==
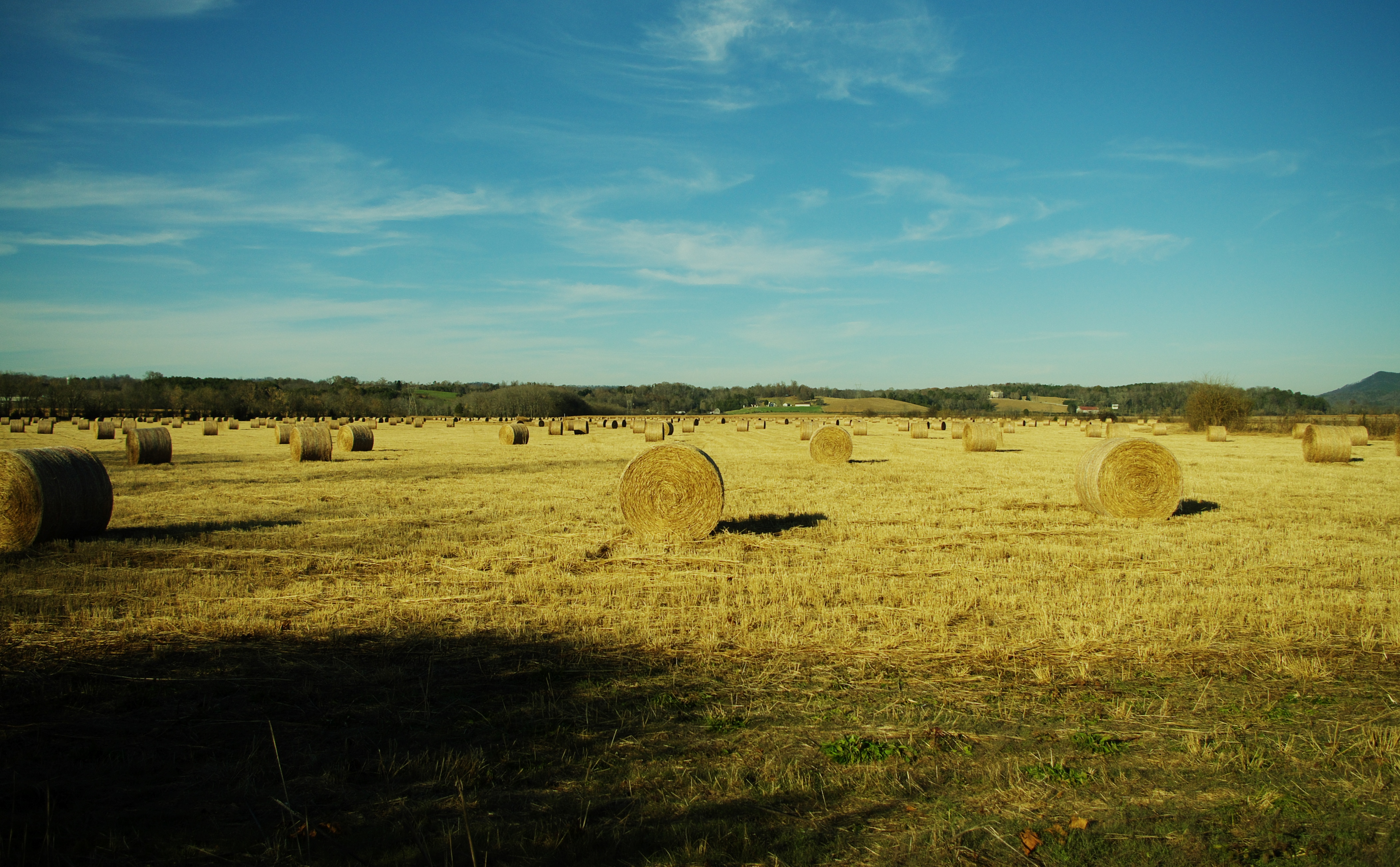
Hay bales in Tellico Plains

According to the U.S. Census Bureau, the county has a total area of 653 square miles (1,690 km^{2}), of which 17 square miles (44 km^{2}) (2.6%) are covered by water. The Unicoi Mountains, part of the greater Blue Ridge chain, dominate the southeastern part of the county. The crest of this range marks Monroe's boundaries with the North Carolina counties, Graham and Cherokee, and contains the county's highest elevation of 5,472 feet (1,668 m) at Haw Knob.

The Little Tennessee River flows along Monroe County's border with Blount County to the northeast. Three artificial lakes—Tellico Lake, Chilhowee Lake, and Calderwood Lake—were developed in this section of the river. The Tellico River, a tributary of the Little Tennessee, drains much of the southwestern part of the county. The Bald River, noted for scenic Bald River Falls, is a tributary of the Tellico River. Sweetwater Creek, a tributary of the Tennessee River, drains a portion of northern Monroe County.

=== Adjacent counties ===
- Loudon County (north)
- Blount County (northeast)
- Graham County, North Carolina (east)
- Cherokee County, North Carolina (southeast)
- Polk County (southwest)
- McMinn County (west)

=== National protected areas ===
- Bald River Gorge Wilderness
- Cherohala Skyway (part)
- Cherokee National Forest (part)
- Citico Creek Wilderness

=== State protected areas ===
- Fort Loudoun State Park
- Tellico Blockhouse State Historic Site
- Tellico Lake Wildlife Management Area (part)

== Demographics ==
Historical population
Census	Pop.	Note	%±
1820	2,529		—
1830	13,708		442.0%
1840	12,056		−12.1%
1850	11,874		−1.5%
1860	12,607		6.2%
1870	12,589		−0.1%
1880	14,283		13.5%
1890	15,329		7.3%
1900	18,585		21.2%
1910	20,716		11.5%
1920	22,060		6.5%
1930	21,377		−3.1%
1940	24,275		13.6%
1950	24,513		1.0%
1960	23,316		−4.9%
1970	23,475		0.7%
1980	28,700		22.3%
1990	30,541		6.4%
2000	38,961		27.6%
2010	44,519		14.3%
2020	46,250		3.9%
2025 (est.)	49,730	▲	7.5%
U.S. Decennial Census; 1790–1960 1900–1990; 1990–2000 2010–2014

=== Racial and ethnic composition ===
Monroe County, Tennessee – Racial and ethnic composition Note: the US Census treats Hispanic/Latino as an ethnic category. This table excludes Latinos from the racial categories and assigns them to a separate category. Hispanics/Latinos may be of any race.
Race / Ethnicity (NH = Non-Hispanic)	Pop 1980	Pop 1990	Pop 2000	Pop 2010	Pop 2020	% 1980	% 1990	% 2000	% 2010	% 2020
White alone (NH)	27,591	29,468	36,677	41,146	41,185	96.14%	96.49%	94.14%	92.42%	89.05%
Black or African American alone (NH)	883	831	873	900	736	3.08%	2.72%	2.24%	2.02%	1.59%
Native American or Alaska Native alone (NH)	11	47	136	199	141	0.04%	0.15%	0.35%	0.45%	0.30%
Asian alone (NH)	24	70	130	151	194	0.08%	0.23%	0.33%	0.34%	0.42%
Native Hawaiian or Pacific Islander alone (NH)	x	x	0	10	2	x	x	0.00%	0.02%	0.00%
Other race alone (NH)	29	2	17	11	85	0.10%	0.01%	0.04%	0.02%	0.18%
Mixed race or Multiracial (NH)	x	x	444	654	1,970	x	x	1.14%	1.47%	4.26%
Hispanic or Latino (any race)	162	123	684	1,448	1,937	0.56%	0.40%	1.76%	3.25%	4.19%
Total	28,700	30,541	38,961	44,519	46,250	100.00%	100.00%	100.00%	100.00%	100.00%

=== 2020 census ===
As of the 2020 census, the county had a population of 46,250, with 18,746 households and 12,847 families residing in the county. The median age was 45.2 years, with 21.1% of residents under the age of 18 and 22.0% of residents 65 years of age or older.

For every 100 females there were 97.4 males, and for every 100 females age 18 and over there were 94.7 males.

26.7% of residents lived in urban areas, while 73.3% lived in rural areas.

The racial makeup of the county was 90.1% White, 1.6% Black or African American, 0.4% American Indian and Alaska Native, 0.4% Asian, <0.1% Native Hawaiian and Pacific Islander, 1.9% from some other race, and 5.5% from two or more races. Hispanic or Latino residents of any race comprised 4.2% of the population.

There were 18,746 households in the county, of which 27.6% had children under the age of 18 living in them. Of all households, 51.6% were married-couple households, 17.5% were households with a male householder and no spouse or partner present, and 24.5% were households with a female householder and no spouse or partner present. About 26.5% of all households were made up of individuals and 13.2% had someone living alone who was 65 years of age or older.

There were 21,286 housing units, of which 11.9% were vacant. Among occupied housing units, 75.1% were owner-occupied and 24.9% were renter-occupied. The homeowner vacancy rate was 1.5% and the rental vacancy rate was 8.3%.

=== 2010 census ===
As of the 2010 United States census, 44,519 people were residing in the county in 20,581 housing units. The population density was 70.00 persons per square mile and the housing unit density was 32.36 units per square mile. The racial makeup of the county was 95.23% White, 2.14% Black or African American, 0.48% Native American, 0.39% Asian, 0.02% Pacific Islander, and 1.48% from two or more races. Those of Hispanic or Latino origins were 3.30% of the population.

=== 2000 census ===
As of the census of 2000, 38,961 people, 15,329 households, and 11,236 families lived in the county. The population density was 61 people per square mile (24 people/km^{2}). The 17,287 housing units had an average density of 27 per square mile (10/km^{2}). The racial makeup of the county was 94.87% White, 2.27% African American, 0.36% Native American, 0.36% Asian, 0.02% Pacific Islander, 0.86% from other races, and 1.26% from two or more races. Hispanics or Latinos of any race comprised about 1.76% of the population.

Monroe County welcome sign

Of the 15,329 households, 32.1% had children under 18 living with them, 59.4% were married couples living together, 10.0% had a female householder with no husband present, and 26.7% were not families. About 23.3% of all households were made up of individuals, and 9.4% had someone living alone who was 65 or older. The average household size was 2.51 and the average family size was 2.94.

In the county, the age distribution was 24.7% under the age of 18, 8.7% from 18 to 24, 28.6% from 25 to 44, 24.80 from 45 to 64, and 13.2% who were 65 or older. The median age was 37 years. For every 100 females, there were 97.20 males. For every 100 females 18 and over, there were 93.90 males.

The median income for a household in the county was $30,337, and for a family was $34,902. Males had a median income of $29,621 versus $21,064 for females. The per capita income for the county was $14,951. 15.50% of the population and 12.00% of families were below the poverty line. Out of the total population, 19.40% of those under the age of 18 and 17.70% of those 65 and older were living below the poverty line.

== Education ==
Monroe County Schools serve most of the county for all grades and the county for high school. Residents of Sweetwater are served by Sweetwater City Schools for elementary through junior high school.

The following schools serve communities in Monroe County.

Madisonville

- Madisonville Primary
- Madisonville Intermediate
- Madisonville Middle
- Sequoyah High

Vonore

- Vonore Elementary
- Vonore Middle

Tellico Plains

- Tellico Plains Elementary
- Tellico Plains Junior High
- Tellico Plains High
- Rural Vale
- Coker Creek Elementary

Sweetwater

- Sweetwater Primary
- Sweetwater Elementary
- Brown Intermediate
- Sweetwater Junior High
- Sweetwater High School

Tennessee Meiji Gakuin High School was located in Sweetwater from 1989 to 2007.

== Parks, forests, and natural features ==
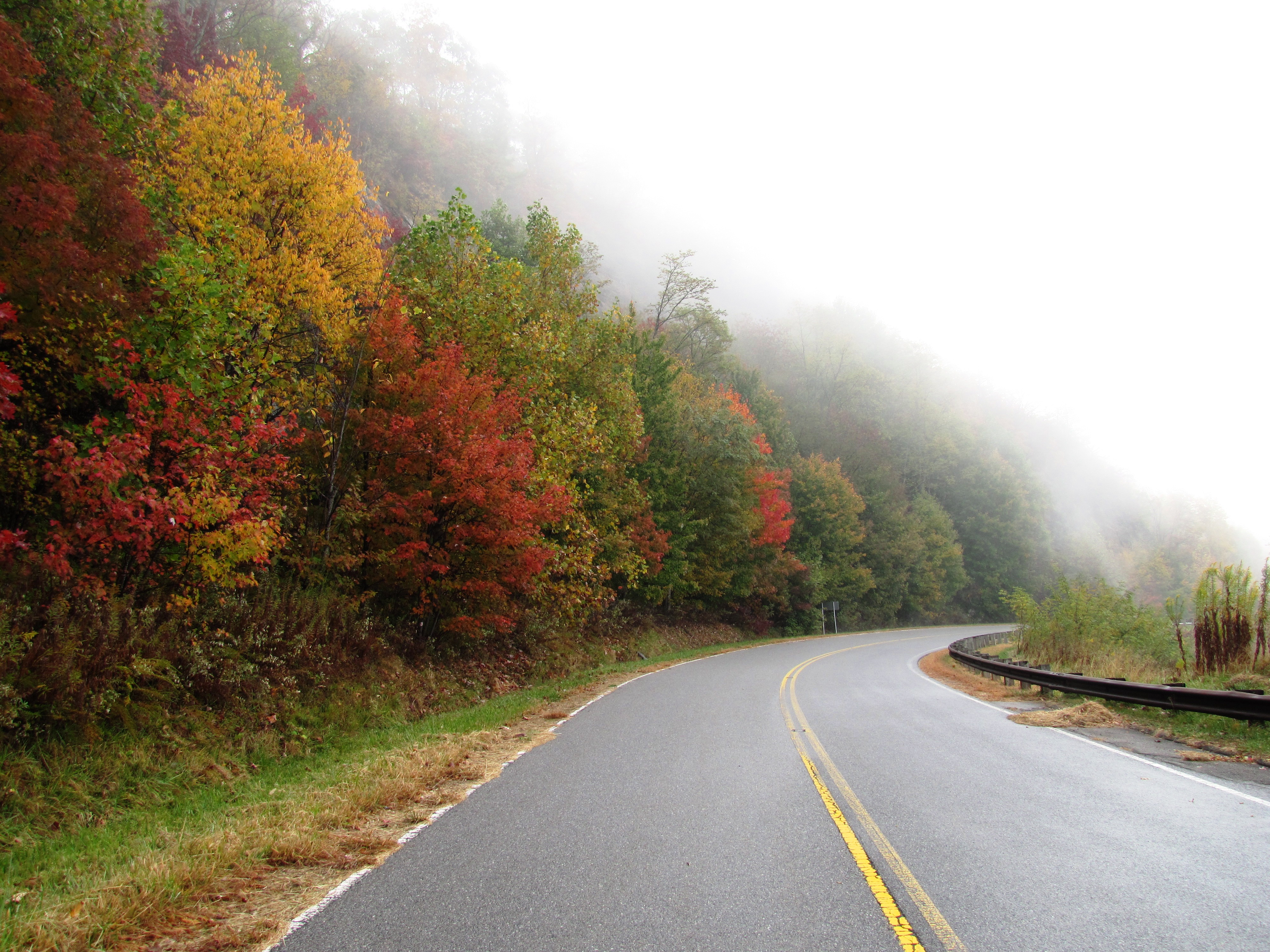
Cherohala Skyway in autumn

A portion of the county is included in the Cherokee National Forest. The Monroe section of the forest includes two federally designated wilderness areas— Citico Creek and Bald River Gorge. The Joyce Kilmer Memorial Forest is located just across the North Carolina border to the east. The Great Smoky Mountains National Park is located just across the Blount County border to the northeast.

The Cherohala Skyway, a national scenic byway, connects Tellico Plains with Robbinsville, North Carolina. Crossing the Unicoi Mountains, the road peaks at an elevation over 5,000 feet.

Fort Loudoun State Park is located on a peninsula near Vonore, and includes a replica of the 18th-century colonial Fort Loudoun. The Tellico Blockhouse site lies across the river to the north from Fort Loudoun. The layout of the 1790s-era blockhouse is marked by stones and posts. The Sequoyah Museum, dedicated to the Cherokee scholar who independently created a syllabary, a writing system for his language, is located near Fort Loudoun.

The Lost Sea is a commercially operated cave located 7 miles southeast of Sweetwater in Monroe County. The lake was discovered by Ben Sands in 1905 when he was 13 years old. The underground lake for which it is named is the largest in North America. Today, the cave tour features a ride on the lake in boats with electric motors. In 1940, fossilized skeletons and footprints of two Pleistocene jaguars (Panthera onca augusta) were discovered in the cave. They were excavated by George Gaylord Simpson of the American Museum of Natural History.

== Transportation ==
U.S. Route 411 runs through the center of the county and through the cities of Madisonville and Vonore. U.S. Route 11 runs through the northwestern part of the county and through the center of Sweetwater. State Route 68 runs in a northwest–southeast direction through the lower half of the county, passing through Sweetwater, Madisonville, and Tellico Plains. State Route 39 connects Tellico Plains to Englewood in McMinn County. State Route 72 connects southern Vonore to Loudon. Interstate 75 is located in the extreme northeastern tip of the county west of Sweetwater, and contains two exits in Monroe County. Secondary state routes in Monroe County include State Routes 165 (Cherohala Skyway), 307, 315, 322, and 360.

The Monroe County Airport is a county-owned, public-use airport located two nautical miles (3.7 km) northwest of the central business district of Madisonville.

== Communities ==
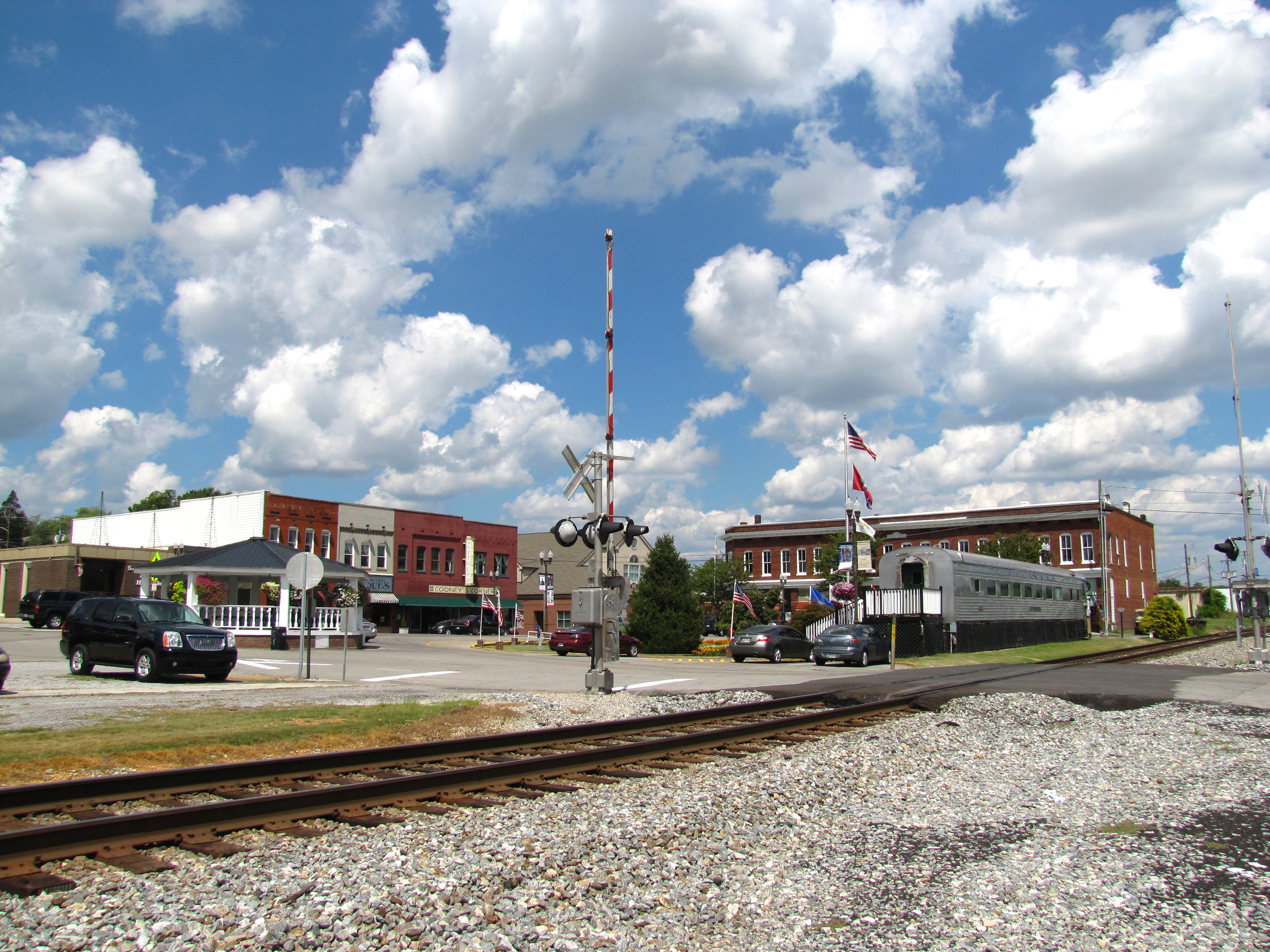
Sweetwater

=== Cities ===
- Madisonville (county seat)
- Sweetwater

=== Towns ===
- Tellico Plains
- Vonore (partial)

=== Census-designated places ===
- Coker Creek
- Kahite
- Rarity Bay (partly in Loudon Co.)

=== Other unincorporated communities ===
- Ballplay
- Hopewell Mill
- Hopewell Springs
- Jalapa
- Toqua

== Notable residents ==
- William Heiskell, post-Civil War speaker of the Tennessee House of Representatives
- Sue K. Hicks, a Scopes Trial attorney and later judge, is believed to be the inspiration for the song, "A Boy Named Sue".
- Ray Jenkins, defense attorney and senate counsel during the Army-McCarthy Hearings
- Estes Kefauver, U.S. senator
- Sharon Gail Lee, Tennessee Supreme Court justice
- Charles McClung McGhee, late 19th-century railroad tycoon
- Sequoyah, a Cherokee scholar born in Tuskegee Village (near Vonore), created the Cherokee syllabary, making reading and writing in Cherokee possible.
- John C. Vaughn, a Confederate brigadier general, was a sheriff and California Gold Rush prospector.
- Mary Ware (writer) (1828–1915), poet, prose writer
- Nancy Ward, a Beloved Woman and political leader of the Cherokee, was born in Chota.

== Politics ==
Monroe County, like most of East Tennessee, votes strongly Republican in presidential elections. The last election in which a Republican failed to carry it was in 1976, when Democrat Jimmy Carter narrowly carried it by 33 votes.

United States presidential election results for Monroe County, Tennessee
Year	Republican		Democratic		Third party(ies)	
Year	No.	%	No.	%	No.	%
1912	721	30.86%	1,136	48.63%	479	20.51%
1916	1,459	53.23%	1,263	46.08%	19	0.69%
1920	2,575	58.26%	1,845	41.74%	0	0.00%
1924	2,480	52.56%	2,226	47.18%	12	0.25%
1928	3,297	61.94%	2,026	38.06%	0	0.00%
1932	1,504	33.59%	2,954	65.97%	20	0.45%
1936	3,493	45.97%	4,106	54.03%	0	0.00%
1940	3,253	43.86%	4,121	55.57%	42	0.57%
1944	3,424	50.21%	3,385	49.64%	10	0.15%
1948	3,905	51.75%	3,553	47.08%	88	1.17%
1952	4,581	55.11%	3,693	44.42%	39	0.47%
1956	4,998	58.28%	3,511	40.94%	67	0.78%
1960	4,991	59.05%	3,375	39.93%	86	1.02%
1964	4,349	51.47%	4,100	48.53%	0	0.00%
1968	4,749	53.38%	2,926	32.89%	1,222	13.73%
1972	5,657	65.52%	2,870	33.24%	107	1.24%
1976	5,335	49.60%	5,368	49.91%	53	0.49%
1980	6,246	56.45%	4,612	41.68%	207	1.87%
1984	6,665	60.88%	4,223	38.58%	59	0.54%
1988	6,355	61.15%	4,000	38.49%	38	0.37%
1992	6,025	48.55%	5,384	43.38%	1,002	8.07%
1996	5,257	48.11%	4,872	44.58%	799	7.31%
2000	7,514	57.79%	5,327	40.97%	162	1.25%
2004	10,123	65.02%	5,354	34.39%	91	0.58%
2008	11,484	68.45%	5,053	30.12%	240	1.43%
2012	11,731	71.80%	4,372	26.76%	235	1.44%
2016	13,374	78.24%	3,186	18.64%	533	3.12%
2020	16,783	80.70%	3,764	18.10%	250	1.20%
2024	18,526	82.99%	3,608	16.16%	189	0.85%

== See also ==
- National Register of Historic Places listings in Monroe County, Tennessee
- List of counties in Tennessee
