= Vonore, Tennessee =

Vonore
- Town
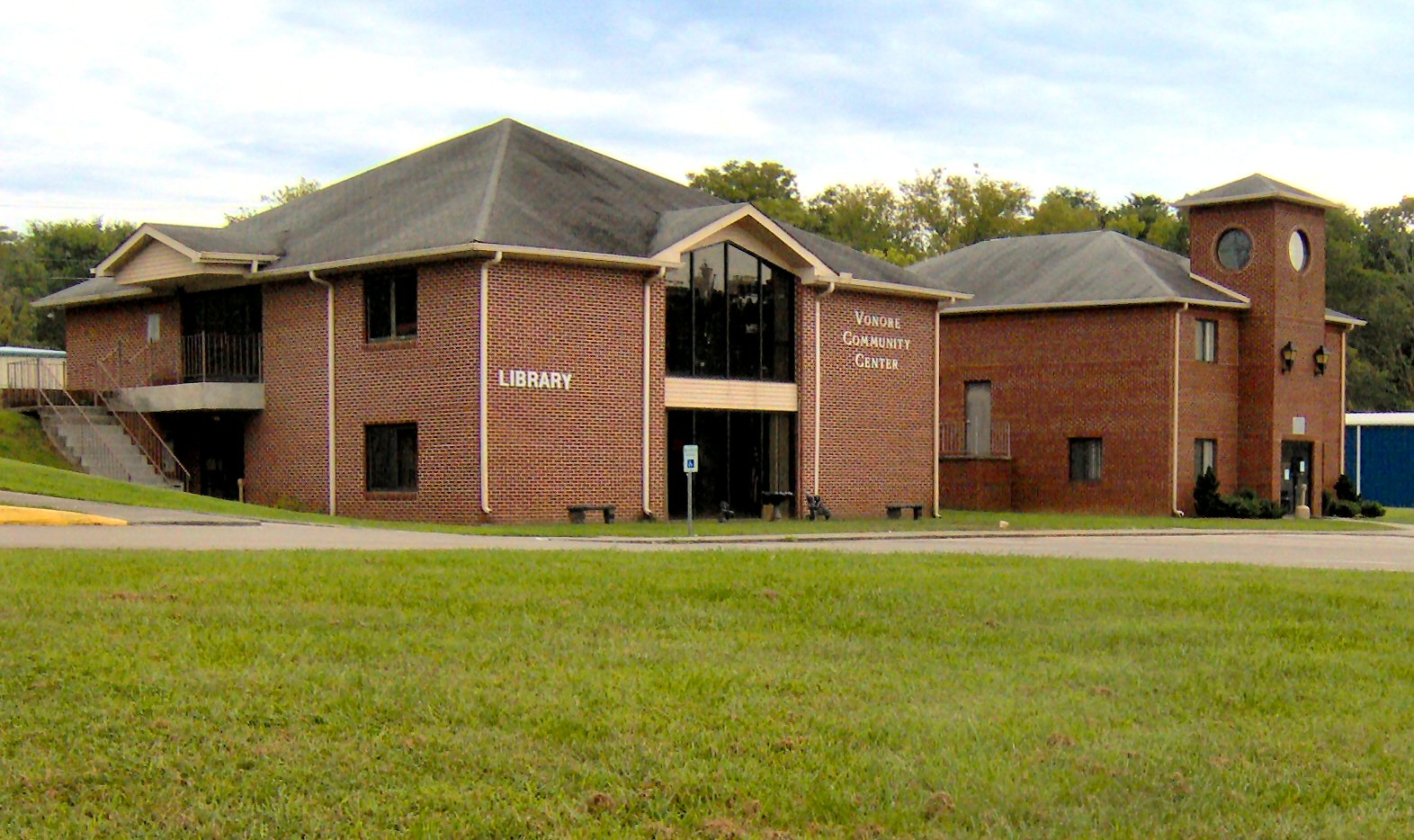
- Community center and city hall in Vonore

- Seal

- Location of Vonore in Monroe County, Tennessee.
- Coordinates: 35°35′52″N 84°14′11″W
- Country: United States
- State: Tennessee
- County: Monroe and Blount County, Tennessee
- Established: 1890s
- Incorporated: 1965
- Named for: Combination of von and ore

Government
  - Type: Mayor-aldermanic
  - Mayor: John Hammontree
  - Board of Aldermen: List of aldermen: Alisa Hobbs; Steve Wheeler; Kristi Windsor

Area
  - Total: 11.75 sq mi (30.44 km^{2})
  - Land: 8.81 sq mi (22.82 km^{2})
  - Water: 2.94 sq mi (7.61 km^{2})
- Elevation: 837 ft (255 m)

Population (2020)
  - Total: 1,574
  - Density: 178.6/sq mi (68.97/km^{2})
- Time zone: UTC-5 (Eastern (EST))
  - Summer (DST): UTC-4 (EDT)
- ZIP code: 37885
- Area code: 423
- FIPS code: 47-77480
- GNIS feature ID: 2406807
- Website: www.town-of-vonore.com

Vonore is a town in Monroe County and Blount County, Tennessee, in the southeastern portion of the state. The population was 1,574 as of the 2020 census. The city hall, library, community center, police department, and fire department are located on Church Street.

== History ==
Vonore developed at the confluence of the Little Tennessee River and the Tellico River, a place of indigenous settlement for thousands of years. It was a center of numerous Cherokee towns along the rivers.

Vonore is near the center of one of the richest archaeological regions in the southeastern United States. The now-submerged Icehouse Bottom site was occupied by indigenous cultures in the region as early as 7500 B.C.

The now-submerged Rose Island was home to a significant Woodland period (c. 1000 B.C. – 1000 A.D.) settlement. Later the Cherokee had the town there known as Mialoguo. A substantial South Appalachian Mississippian period (c. 1000–1600 A.D.) village was located at Toqua, immediately south of present-day Vonore. There is some evidence that Toqua's Mississippian village was the village of "Tali", recorded as visited by the Spanish explorer Hernando de Soto's expedition in 1540. The historic Cherokee also had a town at Toqua.

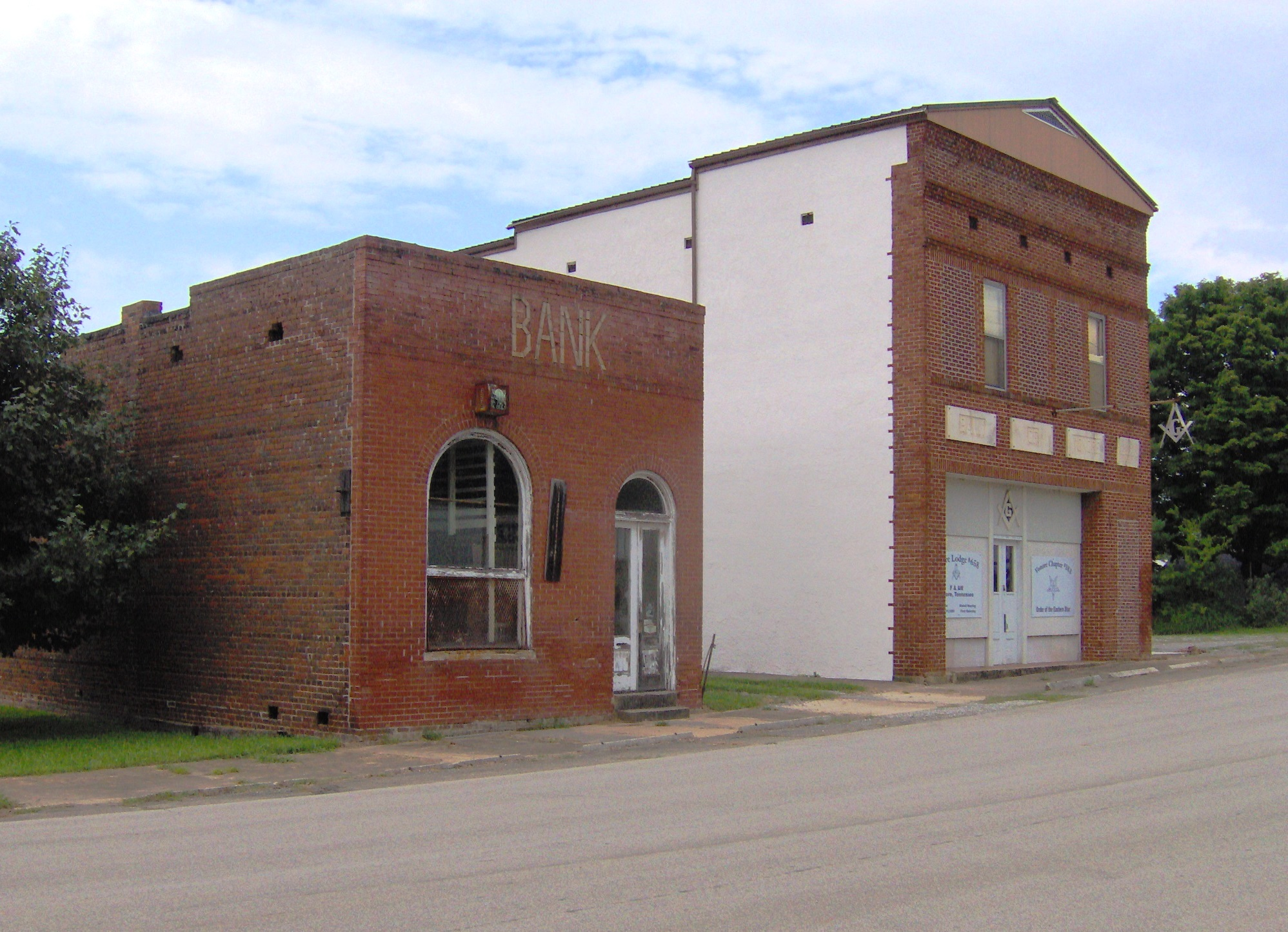
Old bank building and Order of the Eastern Star lodge in Vonore

This area was part of the homelands of the historic Cherokee people, which extended into western Virginia, North and South Carolina, and northeastern Georgia, long before these colonies or states were founded. By the time Euro-American explorers arrived in the area in the 18th century, the Cherokee had established several towns along the Little Tennessee. They included Tanasi, the name source for the state of Tennessee, Chilowhee, and Chota, the "mother town" of the Overhill Cherokee in the mid to late 18th century. The English traders and colonists referred to these places as the Overhill Towns, because they crossed the Appalachian Mountains from the east to reach them. Cherokee chief Dragging Canoe came from Mialoquo, which was located just north of the site of the modern US-411 bridge. Tuskegee, which developed adjacent to Fort Loudoun, was the birthplace of Sequoyah (c. 1770–1843), creator of the written Cherokee syllabary.

Fort Loudoun was a British colonial-era fort built in 1756 as part of their promise to the Cherokee of supporting their people, to gain an alliance against the French and Indian allies during the French and Indian War. It was one of the first major British outposts west of the Appalachian Mountains. It was garrisoned only until 1760, when the Cherokee captured it after a lengthy siege, in retaliation for the murder of Cherokee chiefs by South Carolina officials.

After the American Revolutionary War, the United States built the Tellico Blockhouse in 1794, an American outpost located across the Tellico River from Fort Loudoun. It was designed to hold a garrison to help keep the peace between the Cherokee and the fast-encroaching American settlers. The Tellico agent, the chief American diplomat to the Cherokee, operated out of the blockhouse and ran a trading post there for a decade. He was married to a Cherokee woman.

In 1819, the Cherokee signed the Calhoun Treaty, ceding what is now Monroe County to the United States. The county was established shortly thereafter.

Niles Ferry, the primary crossing of the Little Tennessee River along the Old Federal Road (the predecessor of US-411), was established in 1805 by early settler Barclay McGhee. He leased the rights from the US Tellico agent. The ferry operated at this site until 1947, when the US-411 bridge was completed. Barclay McGhee operated the ferry until his death in 1819. It eventually was owned by his son, John McGhee. The ferry is named for J.W.J. Niles, a son-in-law of John McGhee who assumed ownership of the ferry in the 1850s.

In 1890, the Atlanta, Knoxville and Northern Railroad laid tracks through Monroe County. A stopover known as Upton Station was established just beyond the railroad's Little Tennessee River crossing. Three years later, area doctor Walter Kennedy applied for a post office for Upton Station. When the US postal service informed him that the name of Upton Station had been taken, Kennedy chose the name "Vonore", a combination of the German word von (meaning "of") and the English word "ore", as Kennedy believed the town would become a mining town.

In the 1930s during the Great Depression, preservationists aided by Works Progress Administration (WPA) funds of President Franklin D. Roosevelt's administration reconstructed Fort Loudoun. This served as the anchor for a state historic park along the river.

The older part of town developed along Depot and Hall streets. In the 21st century, it includes many older houses, the library, the town hall, and other municipal buildings. A more modern retail corridor, with numerous franchises, spans most of the Vonore section of US-411.

Most of the valley's archaeological sites were flooded in 1979 when the Tennessee Valley Authority completed Tellico Dam at the mouth of the Little Tennessee. Additional reconstruction of Fort Loudoun was undertaken in the 1970s and 1980s. The fort was moved above the range of the water level of the newly created reservoir.

Archaeological surveys and excavations were undertaken along the Little Tennessee River prior to flooding in order to salvage artifacts from known pre-historic and historic sites, including the Cherokee town sites of Tanasi and Chota, and the early US federal period Tellico Blockhouse.

Sites were established above the level of the flood waters, with monuments to mark these two important Cherokee town sites. The one at Chota has eight plaques: seven for the Cherokee clans and one for the nation overall.

Excavators also located the foundation of the Tellico Blockhouse. An area was raised above the water level, and posts and fill were place in order to show visitors its layout on the historic site. The Tanasi and Tellico Blockhouse sites are both now within Fort Loudoun State Park.

== Geography ==
Vonore is located along the northern border of Monroe and Blount Counties. The eastern portion extends into Blount County along Ninemile Creek and around the Ft Loudon State Park. Vonore is situated primarily along the southwestern bank of the Little Tennessee River at its confluence with the Tellico River. This section of the Little Tennessee and the lower Tellico River are both part of Tellico Lake, an artificial reservoir created by Tellico Dam. The Unicoi Mountains and Great Smoky Mountains rise prominently to the south.

According to the United States Census Bureau, the town has a total area of 11.9 square miles (30.9 km^{2}), of which 9.0 square miles (23.3 km^{2}) is land and 2.9 square miles (7.6 km^{2}), or 24.67%, is water.

U.S. Route 411 connects Vonore with Maryville to the northeast and Madisonville to the southwest. Tennessee State Route 72 connects the town with Tellico Village, Loudon, and Interstate 75 to the north. Tennessee State Route 360 connects the town with Fort Loudoun State Park and the rural areas at the base of the mountains to the south.

== Demographics ==
Historical population
Census	Pop.	Note	%±
1970	524		—
1980	528		0.8%
1990	605		14.6%
2000	1,162		92.1%
2010	1,474		26.9%
2020	1,574		6.8%

=== 2020 census ===
Vonore racial composition
Race	Number	Percentage
White (non-Hispanic)	1,454	92.38%
Black or African American (non-Hispanic)	6	0.38%
Native American	7	0.44%
Asian	7	0.44%
Other/Mixed	52	3.3%
Hispanic or Latino	48	3.05%

As of the 2020 United States census, there were 1,574 people, 715 households, and 515 families residing in the town.

=== 2000 census ===
As of the census of 2000, there were 1,162 people, 496 households, and 333 families residing in the town. The population density was 133.6 inhabitants per square mile (51.6/km^{2}). There were 571 housing units at an average density of 65.6 units per square mile (25.3 units/km^{2}). The racial makeup of the town was 95.52% White, 0.17% African American, 0.26% Native American, 0.09% Asian, 0.69% from other races, and 3.27% from two or more races. Hispanic or Latino of any race were 2.58% of the population.

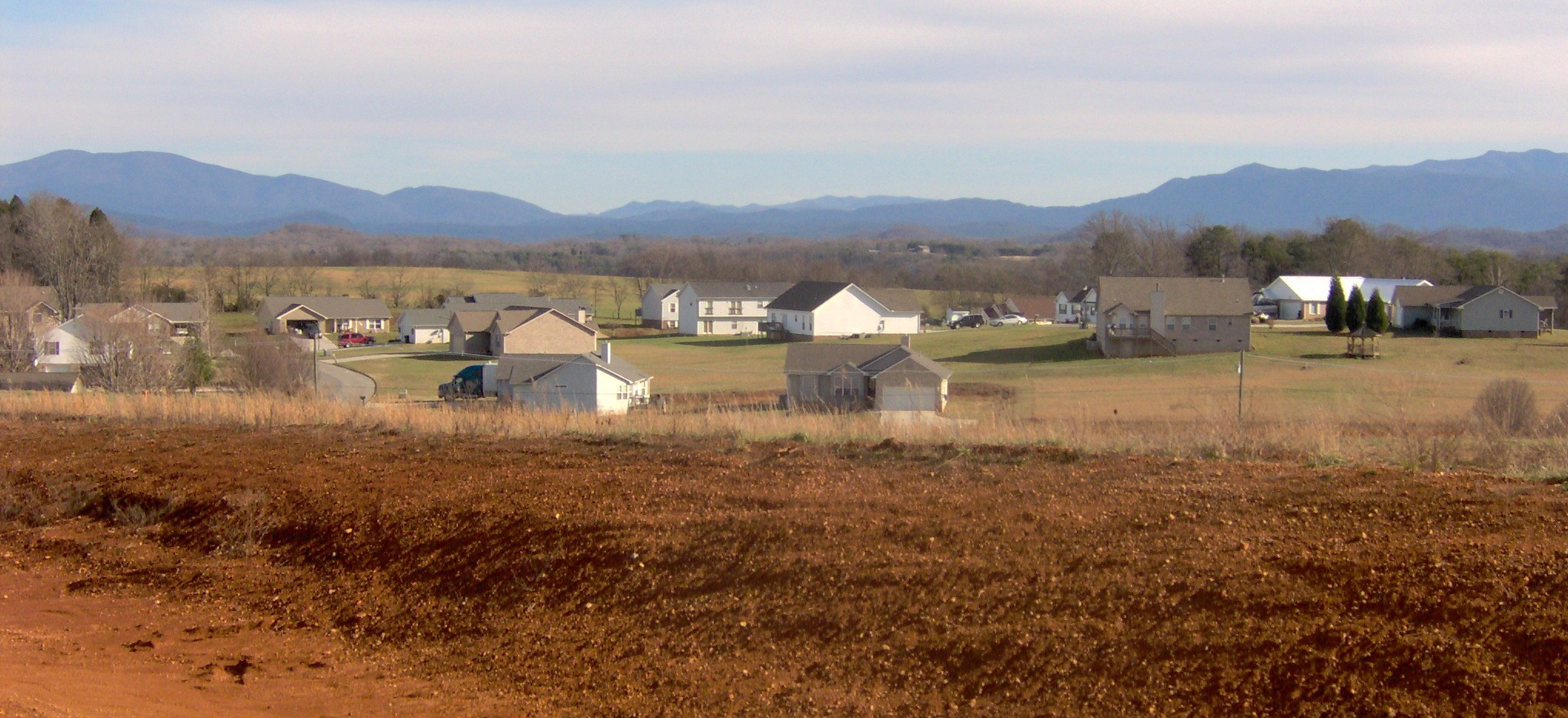
A subdivision in Vonore, just off US-411, with the Great Smokies (left) and the Unicoi Mountains (right) in the distance

There were 496 households, out of which 28.6% had children under the age of 18 living with them, 51.8% were married couples living together, 10.7% had a female householder with no husband present, and 32.7% were non-families. 27.6% of all households were made up of individuals, and 13.5% had someone living alone who was 65 years of age or older. The average household size was 2.34 and the average family size was 2.82.

In the town, the population was spread out, with 23.4% under the age of 18, 7.8% from 18 to 24, 30.6% from 25 to 44, 23.1% from 45 to 64, and 15.1% who were 65 years of age or older. The median age was 36 years. For every 100 females, there were 96.6 males. For every 100 females age 18 and over, there were 91.8 males.

The median income for a household in the town was $34,653, and the median income for a family was $41,125. Males had a median income of $31,429 versus $25,956 for females. The per capita income for the town was $19,613. About 6.1% of families and 10.5% of the population were below the poverty line, including 7.6% of those under age 18 and 13.2% of those age 65 or over.

== Recreation ==
Vonore is located on the shores of Tellico Lake and is the location of two Tennessee State Historic Areas, Fort Loudoun State Historic Park and the Tellico Blockhouse State Historic Site. In addition, the Sequoyah Birthplace Museum, operated by the Eastern Band of Cherokee Indians (EBCI), honors the life of the Cherokee scholar who created the Cherokee syllabary and writing system. He is one of the few people known to have created a writing system.

Several swimming areas have been developed along the lake, including Vonore Beach along the lake's Creek Island Creek embayment near the center of town. Toqua Beach is located just south of Fort Loudoun State Park. The Sequoyah Marina is located off US-411, where the road crosses the lake.

== Education ==
Public schools in Vonore are operated by the Monroe County School System, and include:

- Vonore Elementary School, Grades K-4
- Vonore Middle School, Grades 5–8

Vonore High School consolidated with Madisonville High School in 1995 to form Sequoyah High School in Madisonville. After students graduate from Vonore or Madisonville middle school, they may go to Sequoyah High School, Tellico Plains High School, or other surrounding schools.

== Notable people ==
- Roy Kramer, Former Southeastern Conference Commissioner
- Charles McClung McGhee, railroad baron and financier
- Sequoyah, Cherokee creator of syllabary and writing system
- Mike Stratton, NFL linebacker
- Lowell Russell, State Representative (R), Author, Actor, Pilot, and former State Trooper
- LCPL Franklin “Frankie” N. Watson, United States Marine Corps - Killed In Action 09/24/2011
