= Loudon, Tennessee =

City of Loudon
- City
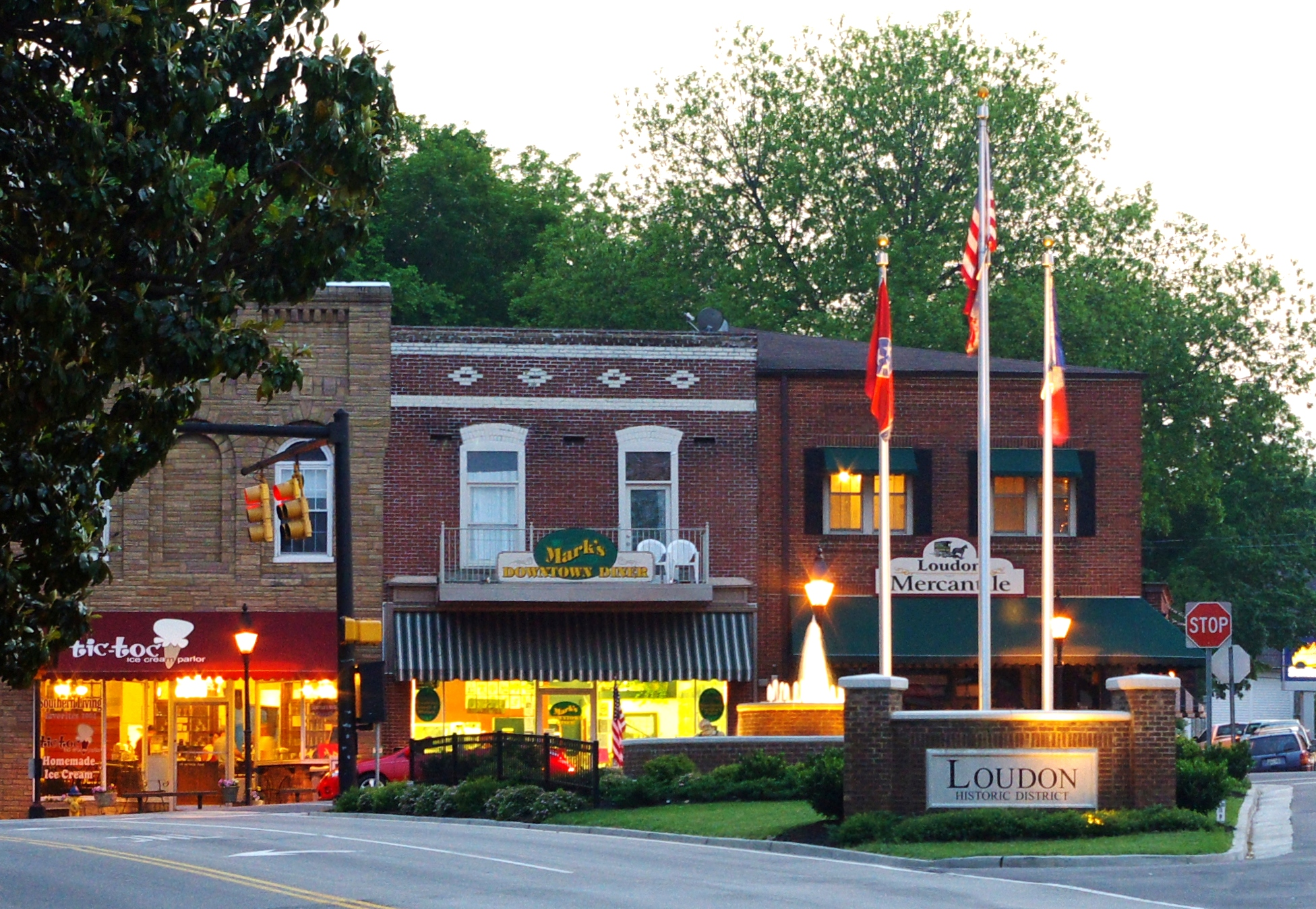

- Flag Seal Logo

- Location of Loudon in Loudon County, Tennessee.
- Coordinates: 35°43′53″N 84°20′47″W
- Country: United States
- State: Tennessee
- County: Loudon
- Settled: 1790s
- Incorporated: 1850
- Named after: Fort Loudoun

Government
  - Type: Mayor/City Council
  - Mayor: Jeff Harris
  - Vice Mayor: Tim Dixon
  - Councilman: John Cardwell
  - Councilman: Kenny Ridings
  - Councilman: Eric Newman

Area
  - Total: 13.05 sq mi (33.80 km^{2})
  - Land: 12.64 sq mi (32.75 km^{2})
  - Water: 0.40 sq mi (1.04 km^{2})
- Elevation: 863 ft (263 m)

Population (2020)
  - Total: 5,991
  - Density: 473.8/sq mi (182.92/km^{2})
- Time zone: UTC-5 (Eastern (EST))
  - Summer (DST): UTC-4 (EDT)
- ZIP code: 37774
- Area code: 865
- FIPS code: 47-43780
- GNIS feature ID: 2406045
- Website: www.cityofloudontn.org

Loudon is a city in and the county seat of Loudon County, Tennessee, United States. Its population was 6,001 at the 2020 census. It is included in the Knoxville, Tennessee Metropolitan Statistical Area. The city is located in East Tennessee, southwest of Knoxville, on the Tennessee River. Fort Loudoun, the colonial era fort for which the city was named, is located several miles to the south in Monroe County.

== Geography ==
According to the United States Census Bureau, the city has a total area of 9.6 square miles (25 km^{2}), of which 9.3 square miles (24 km^{2}) is land and 0.3 square miles (0.78 km^{2}) (3.42%) is water.

== Demographics ==
Historical population
Census	Pop.	Note	%±
1880	832		—
1890	942		13.2%
1900	875		−7.1%
1910	995		13.7%
1930	2,578		—
1940	3,017		17.0%
1950	3,567		18.2%
1960	3,812		6.9%
1970	3,728		−2.2%
1980	3,943		5.8%
1990	4,026		2.1%
2000	4,476		11.2%
2010	5,381		20.2%
2020	5,991		11.3%
2025 (est.)	6,963	▲	16.2%

=== 2020 census ===
As of the 2020 census, Loudon had a population of 5,991, 2,358 households, and 1,337 families residing in the city.

The median age in Loudon was 39.7 years; 23.0% of residents were under the age of 18 and 19.6% were 65 years of age or older. For every 100 females there were 91.5 males, and for every 100 females age 18 and over there were 86.7 males age 18 and over.

88.8% of residents lived in urban areas, while 11.2% lived in rural areas.

There were 2,358 households in Loudon, of which 31.3% had children under the age of 18 living in them. Of all households, 47.3% were married-couple households, 16.0% were households with a male householder and no spouse or partner present, and 29.8% were households with a female householder and no spouse or partner present. About 29.4% of all households were made up of individuals and 14.5% had someone living alone who was 65 years of age or older.

There were 2,590 housing units, of which 9.0% were vacant. The homeowner vacancy rate was 2.4% and the rental vacancy rate was 6.9%.

Racial composition as of the 2020 census
Race	Number	Percent
White	4,347	72.6%
Black or African American	142	2.4%
American Indian and Alaska Native	46	0.8%
Asian	51	0.9%
Native Hawaiian and Other Pacific Islander	1	0.0%
Some other race	861	14.4%
Two or more races	543	9.1%
Hispanic or Latino (of any race)	1,308	21.8%

=== 2010 census ===
As of the census of 2010, there were 5,381 people, 1,910 households. The population density was 389.4 inhabitants per square mile (150.3/km^{2}). There were 2,426 housing units. The racial makeup of the city was 83% White, 3% African American, 0.31% Native American, 0.2% Asian, 11% from other races, and 2% from two or more races. Hispanic or Latino of any race were 16.1% of the population.

There were 1,910 households, out of which 23.6% had children under the age of 18 living with them, 49.0% were married couples living together, 12.3% had a female householder with no husband present, and 35.3% were non-families. 31.3% of all households were made up of individuals, and 16.3% had someone living alone who was 65 years of age or older. The average household size was 2.29 and the average family size was 2.85.

In the city the population was spread out, with 21.3% under the age of 18, 7.6% from 18 to 24, 26.3% from 25 to 44, 22.6% from 45 to 64, and 22.3% who were 65 years of age or older. The median age was 42 years. For every 100 females, there were 84.8 males. For every 100 females age 18 and over, there were 80.6 males.

The median income for a household in the city was $31,225, and the median income for a family was $39,410. Males had a median income of $31,229 versus $20,611 for females. The per capita income for the city was $18,281. About 10.7% of families and 17.1% of the population were below the poverty line, including 24.4% of those under age 18 and 15.3% of those age 65 or over.

== Climate ==
The climate in this area is characterized by relatively high temperatures and evenly distributed precipitation throughout the year. According to the Köppen Climate Classification system, Loudon has a Humid subtropical climate, abbreviated "Cfa" on climate maps.

Climate data for Loudon, Tennessee
Month	Jan	Feb	Mar	Apr	May	Jun	Jul	Aug	Sep	Oct	Nov	Dec	Year
Mean daily maximum °C (°F)	10 (50)	12 (54)	16 (61)	22 (72)	27 (80)	31 (88)	33 (91)	32 (90)	29 (85)	23 (74)	16 (61)	11 (51)	22 (71)
Mean daily minimum °C (°F)	−2 (29)	−1 (30)	2 (35)	7 (44)	12 (54)	17 (62)	19 (66)	18 (65)	14 (58)	8 (46)	2 (35)	−2 (29)	8 (46)
Average precipitation cm (inches)	13 (5)	13 (5.1)	13 (5.3)	11 (4.3)	9.7 (3.8)	10 (4)	12 (4.9)	9.9 (3.9)	8.1 (3.2)	7.4 (2.9)	8.9 (3.5)	12 (4.9)	129 (50.8)
Source: Weatherbase

== See also ==
- Blair's Ferry Storehouse
