= Cheaha =

Cheaha may refer to:

- Cheaha Wilderness, Alabama, U.S.
- Cheaha Mountain, Alabama, U.S.
- Hopeful, Alabama, U.S., formerly Cheaha

== See also ==
- Chiaha, a Native American chiefdom
- Chehaw, Georgia, U.S.
