= Deerskin trade in Colonial United States =

Trade between American colonists and Native Americans

The deerskin trade in the Colonial United States was between European settlers and the Native Americans (Indians), especially in the southeastern part of what later became the United States. In the 18th century, deer skins were an important source of revenue for the British colonies and enabled the Indians to purchase European goods, especially guns. Most of the deerskins were exported to England. The trade engaged the Catawba, Shawnee, Cherokee, Muscogee, Choctaw, Chickasaw, and other peoples. The export trade began to expand in the 1670s with the foundation of Charleston, South Carolina and boomed in the 1700s, mostly ending with the American Revolutionary War (1775-1783) and the decimation of the whitetail deer population in the region. The Cherokee and others mainly traded their deer skins to the English, while the Shawnee traded deer skins to both the French and English colonies prior to 1760.

== Background ==
In the 16th century, when Spanish explorers first came into contact with Indians in the southeastern United States, most of the tribes depended upon agriculture for their livelihood although hunting and gathering were also important. Trading among friendly tribes was carried out over a network of paths criss-crossing the eastern U.S. Trade items included copper, flint, slaves, furs and skins, salt, and handicraft items. Those same paths would later be used for trade with Europeans. When English and French settlers began to come into contact with the interior tribes in the late 17th century, the region was much changed. In a process called the Mississippian shatter zone, the powerful chiefdoms visited by the Spanish such as Cofitachequi in South Carolina and Coosa in Tennessee and Georgia had largely disappeared. The Indian population had decreased, probably due to the impact of the Spanish, the ravages of European diseases such as smallpox, and the growing capture and trade in Indian slaves. The survivors of the chiefdoms and refugees and migrants from other peoples coalesced into new entities by the late 17th century. The best-known of the southeastern peoples were the Five Civilized Tribes: Cherokee in the southern Appalachian Mountains; Muscogee Creeks in Georgia and Alabama; Choctaw in Alabama and Mississippi, Chickasaw in northern Mississippi, and Seminole in northern Florida (although the Seminole were still in a process of formation in the 18th century.).

The southeastern trade in deer hides was stimulated by several factors. First, Charleston, South Carolina was founded in 1670. Charleston became the center of trade for the two main commodities exchanged between whites and Indians, deer hides and slaves. Second, the defeat of the Occaneechi by whites in colonial Virginia in 1676 and the Westo in South Carolina by whites and Shawnee in 1680 opened up the southeastern interior for white and Indian traders. Third, beginning about 1710, recurrent epidemics of rinderpest killed large numbers of Europe's cattle, including in Britain, the main trading partner of the American colonies. As a consequence, the demand for American deerskins increased because of the reduced production in Europe of cattle hides used to make leather.

== The trade ==
The Spanish in Florida and the English in Virginia traded with the American Indians for deerskins, but the industry expanded rapidly after the foundation of Charleston in 1670. The early colonists of South Carolina were mostly from other British colonies, especially Barbados. They brought with them the characteristics of their earlier experiences: a plantation economy which depended upon slave labor and commercial and export oriented agriculture. Trade in Indian slaves and deerskins was essential to the survival of the young colony. Charlestown became the center for trade between Indians and whites in the southeast, initially with slaves and deerskins as the main products obtained from Indians. By the time of the Yamassee War (1715-1717), trade in African slaves largely replaced the demand for Indian slaves. After the war, the deerskin trade became the most important export of South Carolina until the 1730s when rice became more important. In the 1760s deerskins became third in importance to rice and indigo as exports. The American Revolution (1775-1783) interrupted the trade in deer skins and by about 1800 the population of deer east of the Mississippi River in the southeastern United States was depleted and trade in deerskins became unimportant.

In the 17th century, the demand among the Indians for European products such as guns, cotton cloth, steel knives, and iron cooking pots initiated the integration of the Indians into the European world. In the 18th century they became dependent on the Europeans for items that became essential to their culture and even their survival. For example, tribes with guns had a military advantage over tribes without guns and thus the acquisition of guns became a necessity. As one scholar said of the Cherokee, they evolved into a "mobile, free-trade, market economy with heavy reliance on European trade goods and alliances."

In the early 18th century, during Queen Anne's War (1702-1713), the trade in beaver and other furs declined dramatically while the deerskin trade boomed. This was in part due to a shift in London fashions, where a new kind of hat made from leather became popular. This new hat required deerskins and South Carolina increased the scale of its deerskin exports dramatically. Trade in other furs fell sharply. The end of a diversified fur trade altered the relationship between colonists and Native Americans and, in many cases caused an increase in tension and conflict. For example, it was an important factor in the events leading up to the Yamasee War.

== Effects ==
For Native Americans, the trade lessened independence and pulled hunting away from home for long periods, which led to change in family structure. The Catawba, Shawnee, Cherokee, Muscogee, Choctaw, and Chickasaw were mainly affected, because they lived around the main habitat for the white-tailed deer that were most popular for trading. This area has easy ocean access that simplified trading with Europe.

The focus on deerskin led to improved hunting techniques and the use of guns. Guns made hunting faster and easier. This accelerated hunting led to a rapid decline in White-tail deer populations. By 1750, deer were becoming harder to find in Cherokee territory. The trade nearly eliminated deer in the southeast.

The deerskin trade also led to the enslavement of some Native Americans. After the Europeans bought deerskin, they had to haul it to the coast, initially using pack horses, but this was expensive, so some English settlers encouraged Chickasaw to raid and enslave neighboring tribes to lower their costs.

Concurrently, Cherokee were increasingly adopting European trade goods. Since so many Native American families participated in the deer trade, they had access to the European economy and soon were completely reliant on it for goods. These events contributed to growing tensions and conflict between the tribes, as well as with the Europeans.

== See also ==
- Deer hunting
- Leather currency
- Indian trade

== Sources ==
- Drake, Richard B. (2003) A History of Appalachia University Press of Kentucky ISBN 9780813190600
- Braund, Kathryn E. (1996) Deerskins and Duffels: Creek Indian Trade with Anglo-America, 1685-1815 University of Nebraska Press ISBN 9780803261266
