= Citico =

Citico can refer to:

- Citico (Tellico archaeological site) (40MR7) — A prehistoric and historic Native American site in Monroe County, Tennessee, USA
- Citico (Chattanooga, Tennessee) (40HA65) — a prehistoric and historic Native American site in modern Chattanooga, Tennessee, USA.
- Two streams, each called Citico Creek, associated with the Citico sites in Monroe and Hamilton counties in East Tennessee.
- Citico Creek Wilderness — a wilderness area (part of the greater Cherokee National Forest) centered on the stream of the same name in Monroe County, Tennessee
