= Toqua (Tennessee) =

Prehistoric Native American site in Monroe County, Tennessee, United States

- Toqua Site
- U.S. National Register of Historic Places
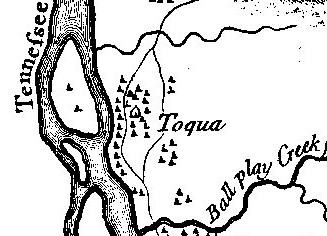
- Toqua as shown on Henry Timberlake's 1762 Draught of the Cherokee Country; North is to the left
- Location: Monroe County, Tennessee
- Nearest city: Vonore
- Coordinates: 35.56806°N 84.17417°W
- Built: circa 900-1000
- NRHP reference No.: 78002618
- Added to NRHP: 1978

Toqua (Cherokee: ᏙᏉ, romanized: Toquo) was a prehistoric and historic Native American site in Monroe County, Tennessee, located in the Southeastern Woodlands. Toqua was the site of a substantial ancestral town that thrived during the Mississippian period (1000-1600 CE). Toqua had a large earthwork 25-foot (7.6 m) platform mound built by the town's Mississippian-era inhabitants, in addition to a second, smaller mound. The site's Mississippian occupation may have been recorded by the Spanish as the village of Tali, which was documented in 1540 by the Hernando de Soto expedition. It was later known as the Overhill Cherokee town Toqua, and this name was applied to the archeological site.

In 1967 an archeological survey was conducted at this site prior to completion of the Tellico Dam, as that project would result in Toqua's inundation by Tellico Lake. The Toqua site was important as one of the last remaining Dallas-phase platform mound sites in the valley. In 1978 the archeological site was added to the National Register of Historic Places. In 1979 the Toqua site was submerged after the Little Tennessee River was dammed. The lake is managed by the Tennessee Valley Authority. The shoreline above the Toqua site is now a recreational area managed by the Tennessee Wildlife Resources Agency.

== Geography ==
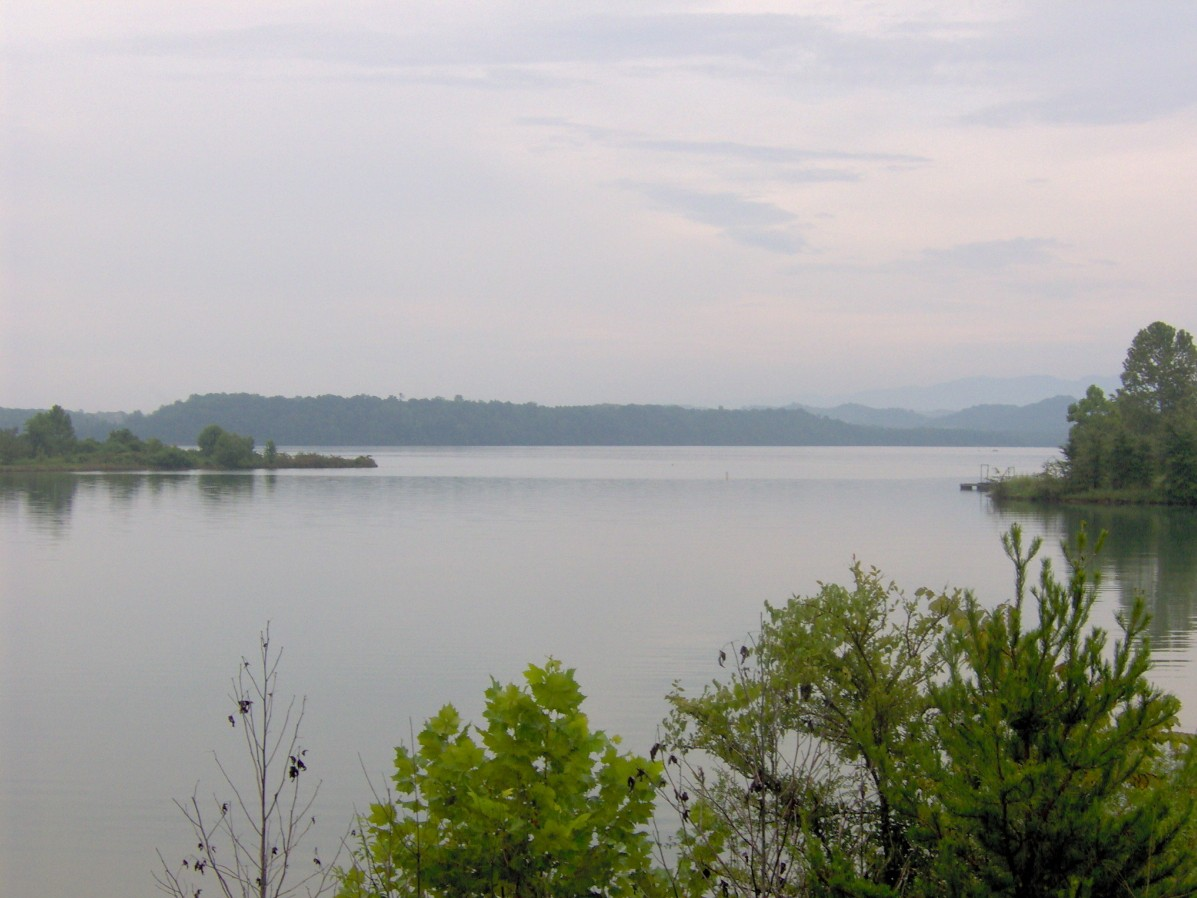
The now-submerged former site of Toqua

The Little Tennessee River, which flows westward from its source in the Appalachian Mountains, traverses northern Monroe County for roughly 40 miles (64 km) before emptying into the Tennessee River near Lenoir City. Tellico Lake, created in 1979 by the construction of Tellico Dam at the mouth of the Little Tennessee, covers the lower 33 miles (53 km) of the river and the lower 22 miles (35 km) of the Tellico River. The Toqua site was situated along the south bank of the Little Tennessee at its confluence with Toqua Creek, approximately 22 miles (35 km) above the mouth of the river.

The shoreline above the now-submerged Toqua site comprises the Toqua Day Use Area Beach and Boat Ramp. It is situated along Tennessee State Route 360 approximately 2 miles (3.2 km) south of the road's junction with U.S. Route 411 at Vonore. The site can be easily be observed from both the road and the boat ramp.

== History ==
=== Protohistory ===
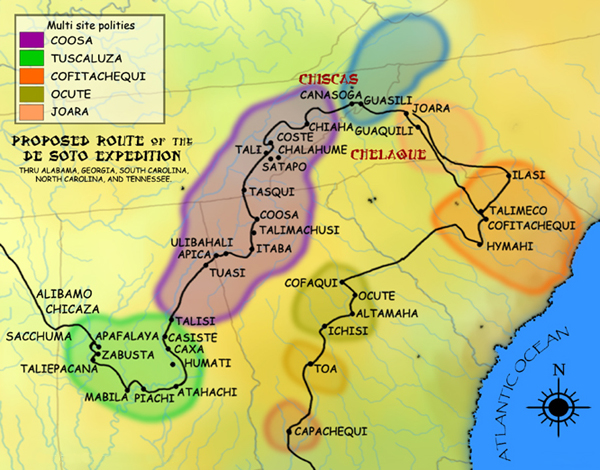
A map showing the route of Hernando de Soto across the southeastern U.S.

The Hernando de Soto expedition (1539–1543) most likely passed through the upper Tennessee Valley en route to the Coosa chiefdom in northern Georgia. The expedition, seeking a passage to the Pacific Ocean, had landed at Florida in May 1539 and marched northward through territory in what are now jurisdictions of Georgia, South Carolina, and North Carolina before crossing the Blue Ridge Mountains via the Nolichucky River into the Tennessee Valley.

After spending several weeks at Chiaha (near modern Douglas Dam), the expedition followed the French Broad River and Tennessee River to the village of Coste, which was on Bussell Island at the mouth of the Little Tennessee River. On July 9, 1540, the expedition left Coste and followed the east bank of the Little Tennessee to the village of Tali, situated on the west bank of the river at what is now known as the Toqua site. The expedition's chroniclers noted that the river at this point was too deep to ford. The sight of the Spaniards created a general panic in Tali, and the villagers attempted to flee downstream in canoes. De Soto apparently deployed his soldiers and forced the villagers to return. The chief of Tali gave the expedition four women and two porters, and de Soto departed with his forces southward the following day. The chief of Tali continued to send rations of sofkee (a gruel similar to hominy grits) and other food until the expedition reached Coosa chiefdom on July 16.

=== Cherokee period ===
The name "Toqua" comes from the Cherokee word Dakwa'yi, meaning "fish place." The name was rooted in a Cherokee legend regarding the Dakwa, or "Great Fish," that lived at the mouth of Toqua Creek.

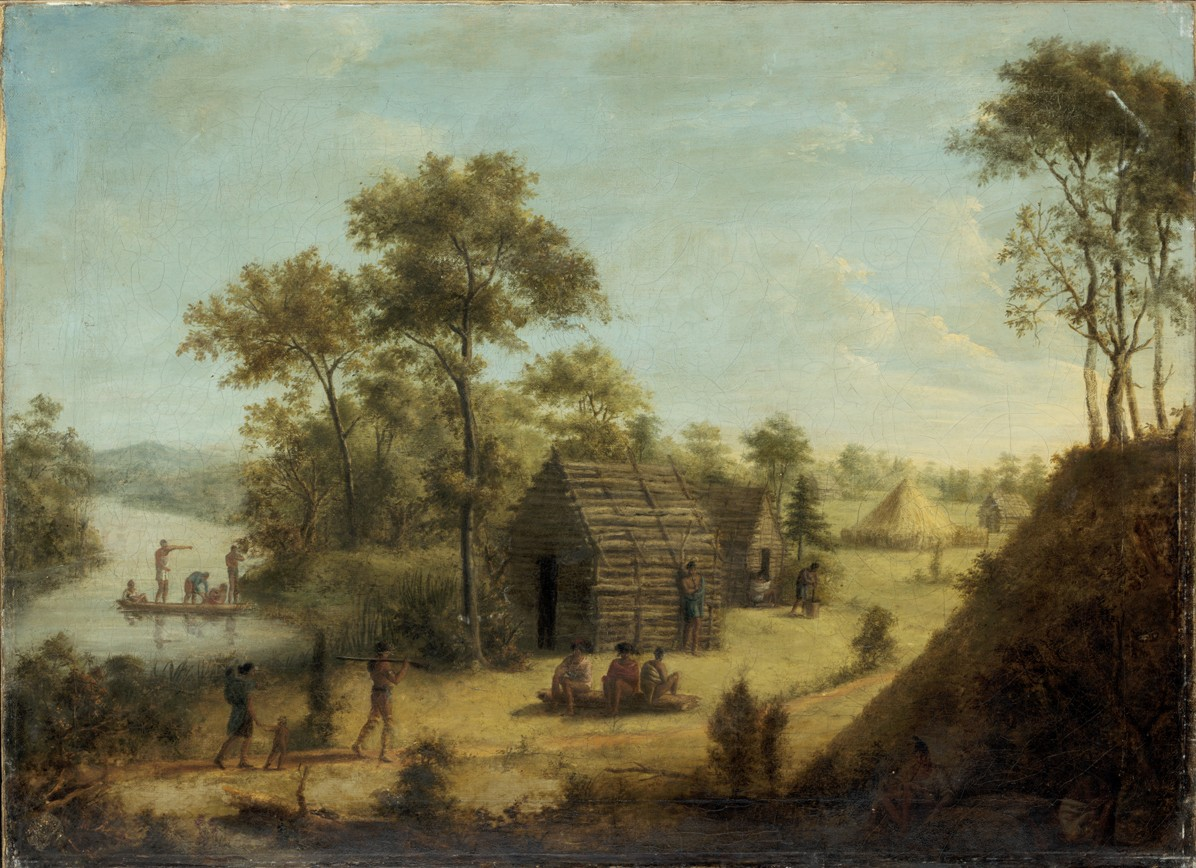
"View of Tokouo, Tennessee” by Antoine-Philippe d’Orléans (1804)

The term Toqua first appears in the historical record in 1751, when it was listed as the base of an English colonial trader named Anthony Dean. In 1756, Toqua sent 30 warriors to aide the British during the French and Indian War, as the front in North America was known. Willanawaw, who was chief of Toqua at the time, had previously been listed as a chief of nearby Tanasi. Henry Timberlake, whose peace mission visited the Overhill towns in 1761, noted that Willanawaw was still the headman at Toqua. He reported that the town was composed of 32 houses and a councilhouse, the latter built as typical on top of the town's platform mound.

The town of Toqua began to decline as Euro-American settlers pushed westward, encroaching on this area. The Overhill towns were repeatedly attacked during the American Revolution and the Cherokee–American wars (1776–1794). Toqua was destroyed by John Sevier in 1788.

In the late 1790s, the Duke of Orleans (and future king of France) Louis-Philippe visited the Tellico Blockhouse as part of extensive travels undertaken while he was in exile. Louis-Philippe reported a councilhouse surrounded by 8 to 10 houses at a site some 3 miles (4.8 km) south of the blockhouse, at what would have been the approximate location of Toqua. He gave a detailed description of the councilhouse's shape and composition.

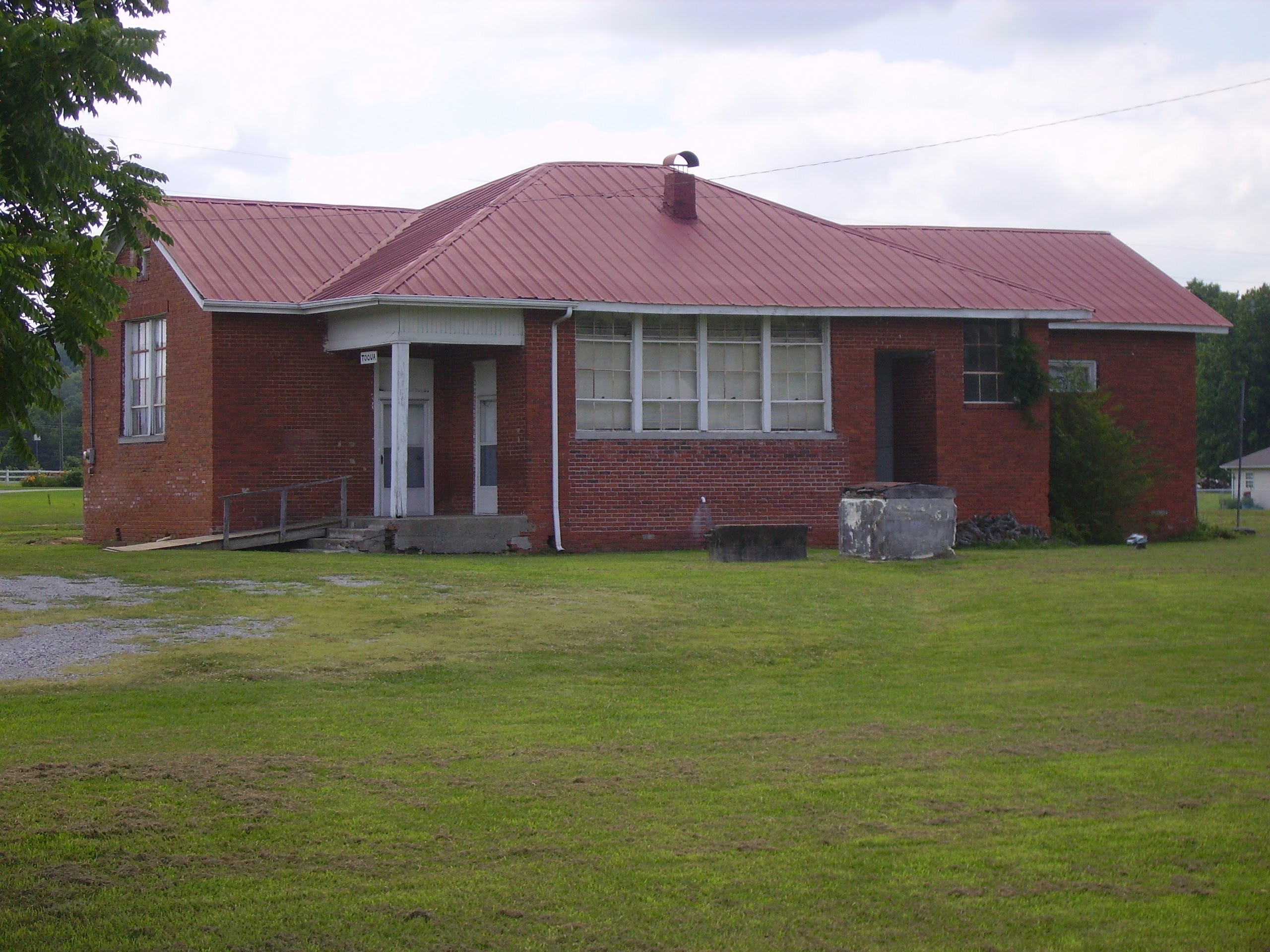
Toqua Community Center

Toqua still had a small population when the Cherokee sold their lands along the Little Tennessee to the U.S. government in 1819, under the terms of the Calhoun Treaty. Shortly after the treaty, an early settler named John McGhee purchased several thousand acres along the Little Tennessee, including the Toqua site. McGhee's descendants, along with many other families, still owned properties in the mid-20th century, when the Tennessee Valley Authority began buying the land in the 1960s in order to construct a dam and Tellico Reservoir.

== Archaeology ==
John W. Emmert, working for the Smithsonian's Bureau of Ethnology, conducted the first archaeological survey of the Toqua area in 1884. In the 1930s, a treasure hunter named George Barnes uncovered hundreds of human bones— most of which he discarded— while digging for artifacts at the Toqua site.

In 1967, in anticipation of the flooding of the site by the construction of Tellico Dam, the University of Tennessee Department of Anthropology began an initial archeological survey of the area to locate sites for further research. Toqua was chosen for excavation as the valley's last remaining Dallas-phase platform mound site. One of the main goals of the University of Tennessee's Toqua investigation was to identify the connection, if any, between the Little Tennessee Valley's Mississippian-period inhabitants and its later historic Cherokee inhabitants. Other goals included establishing a more defined period of Cherokee occupation and to search for evidence of pre-Mississippian occupation.

=== Mississippian period ===
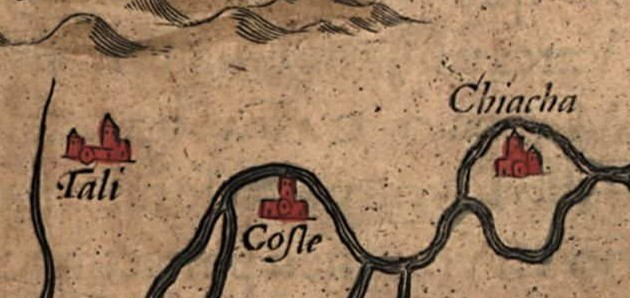
The villages of Chiaha, Coste, and Tali in what is now East Tennessee as they appeared on Chiaves's 1584 map of La Florida

Excavations at Toqua in the 1970s uncovered evidence typical of a Mississippian-period village. The village consisted of a central, level, pebble-covered plaza, flanked by a large "platform" mound (known as "Mound A") and 57 dwellings. A smaller mound, known as "Mound B," was located in the southeastern corner of the village. At its height around 1400, the village covered 4.8 acres (0.019 km^{2}), although its size was later drastically reduced. The village was surrounded by a clay-covered palisade with bastions located at 60-foot (18 m) intervals. Along with revealing the village's layout, the excavation uncovered 477 confirmed human burials, 212 whole or partial ceramic vessels, and several thousand stone artifacts.

The Mississippian structures identified and investigated at the Toqua site included the two mounds and several dwellings. The construction of Mound A occurred in 16 phases and probably began in the 10th century of the Common Era (CE). The mound was approximately 25 feet (7.6 m) high and 154 feet (47 m) in diameter, and topped by two structures, the largest of which measured 100 feet (30 m) x 83 feet (25 m) and contained a central hearth and benches. Excavations at the mound discovered a chert sword, a pot filled with marsh elder seeds, and two high-status female burials. Mound B was 6 feet (1.8 m) high and 93 feet (28 m) in diameter and contained numerous cremated human remains. A typical Mississippian-period dwelling at the Toqua site consisted of 400 square feet (37 m^{2}) of living space, a central hearth, storage areas, and interior partitions.

Analysis of the human remains uncovered at Toqua determined that the height of the average male was 5'6" and the height of the average female was 5'1". Life expectancy was 17.1 years for males and 15.1 years for females. Many of the remains showed signs of widespread iron deficiency, possibly because of a diet relying too much upon corn and consisting of little meat. At its height, the village probably had a population of between 250 and 300.

Toqua was likely the dominant village in the Little Tennessee Valley between 1250 and 1500CE. An increase in mass burials and the reduction of the village to nearly one-half its size in the 16th century indicate a possible decline at Toqua. The village was superseded by rising Dallas phase occupations at Tomotley (almost adjacent to Toqua) and Citico (several miles upstream).

=== Conclusions ===
While excavators were able to establish a rough period of Cherokee occupation at Toqua by matching archaeological finds with historical data, the project's main goal— identifying the relationship between Toqua's pre-Cherokee and Cherokee inhabitants— remained inconclusive. Investigators found no evidence of a "continued" occupation from the Mississippian period to the Overhill period. The link between the pre-Cherokee and Cherokee inhabitants of the Little Tennessee Valley remains an unresolved issue.

== See also ==
- List of sites and peoples visited by the Hernando de Soto Expedition
- Mississippian culture
- Southeastern Ceremonial Complex
