= Citico (Chattanooga, Tennessee) =

Major settlement of the Coosa confederacy

Coordinates: 35.055°N 85.284°W

Citico Town and Mound was a major center of the Coosa confederacy, at the mouth of Citico Creek in the area of what is now Chattanooga, Tennessee. It was second in size to Etowah at the time of Hernando de Soto's march through the area in 1540 CE. In archaeological terms it is considered as part of the 'Dallas phase' of Mississippian/Muscogee culture, c. 1300–1600 CE. For the muskogean version and origin of the name, see "Satapo." Isaac H. Bonsall photographed the site during the American Civil War era in 1864 when it was part of a garden for convalescent Union soldiers.

Citico mound was the center of Citico town, and survived essentially intact up to the US Civil War when it was dug into and used to store gunpowder. It was partially excavated by Clarence Bloomfield Moore in 1914 and subsequently destroyed in 1915 to create a road extending east upriver from downtown Chattanooga. The Tennessee Division of Archaeology designates the site as "40HA65".

The site is scheduled for destruction in 2016–17 as part of the City of Chattanooga-Hamilton County Cannon brownfield development, Central Avenue extension through Lincoln Park and north across Citico Creek to Riverside Drive, and private college-student housing development.
