= Chehaw Affair =

1818 massacre

The Chehaw Affair (also known as the Chehaw Massacre) was a series of events in 1818 which led to the death of at least five and up to fifty friendly Native Americans in the village of Chehaw at the hands of Captain Obed Wright and his militia.

== Background ==
At the outset of the First Seminole War, Andrew Jackson was called upon to proceed with his Tennessee and Georgia militias into southern Georgia and, if need be, northern Florida to bring about peace. Overzealous as he was, he took his bloated company, by then joined by friendly Lower Creek and Chehaw, and ran amok throughout Spanish Florida, capturing the Spanish towns of St. Marks and Pensacola. In doing so, however, he left southern Georgia settlers unprotected to the few hostile Lower Creek tribes who were emboldened by his absence.

In lieu of these events, Governor William Rabun was forced to dispatch for a part of Jackson's army. However, Jackson was too far gone so as to effectively comply at the time, so Rabun issued orders for a militia at Hartford on April 4, 1818 made up of volunteers from Twiggs and Jones counties as well as a contingent of federal troops from Fort Early. This company, led by Captain Obed Wright, would seek to punish the two identified hostile tribes, the Phelemmes and the Hoppones along the Flint River by way of surprise.

== Attack ==
On April 21, Wright embarked with 270 men for Chehaw, which he had decided to attack instead, because he believed a chief of the Hoppones had taken up residence there, the result of being "misled by false information". With that, he left without the fort commander who refused to accompany him, insisting Chehaw was a friendly village. Nevertheless, the next day, with little resistance, Wright's force burned the village down, killing 40 to 50 warriors (or so Wright claimed at the time) in the process without any U.S. loss of life. Meanwhile, seven other accounts saw the death toll between five and ten.

== Conflicting accounts ==
The death toll wasn't the only fact disputed and it wasn't the most contentious. One second hand account in the local paper claimed an Indian man emerged from his house with a white flag, only to be murdered alongside his son, while another explained how the militia were the ones waving a white flag, but that it was done in order to trick the Chehaw into a false sense of security.

A decade later, Jackson himself, used the event as a sort of propaganda in his 1832 campaign for the presidency. Author of Jackson's biography, Philo A. Goodwin, who had defended Jackson's campaign into Florida, embellished the cruelty and barbarism on display that fateful day: "a deeper stain of dishonor or a more intense visitation of wo [sic], was never seen or inflicted, than at the secluded village of the Chehaws."

== Reaction ==
While many newspapers including the Augusta Chronicle, Savannah Republican, National Intelligencer and Niles' Register strongly criticized Wright's actions, Judge C. B. Strong of the Georgia Superior Court and Governor Rabun, "who took on the responsibility", rushed to his defense.

The events would have remained relatively local in newsworthiness had it not been for Jackson, who upon hearing of them, was furious for it was at Chehaw where he'd been generously resupplied and joined by 40 brave warriors. In a letter to one of his subordinates on May 7, he wrote of an "outrageous and inhuman attack" that "will be a stigma on the American nation, unless the general government use their endeavors to bring the perpetrators to justice." He then wrote a scolding letter to Governor Rabun ordering the arrest and military prosecution of Wright. Rabun responded with indignation, pointing to Jackson's non-response to his earlier letter in Florida. Both followed up by writing Secretary of War John C. Calhoun on the matter. This correspondence, which thusly continued for some time, was published nationally.

Once again, editors, this time across the country, including those at the Georgia Journal and Richmond Enquirer, saw the military man, Jackson, in the wrong for his temperance toward Rabun and assertions regarding the Governor's authority.

== Legal action ==
On December 10, 1818, a resolution introduced to the House by Henry R. Storrs of New York requested copies of any correspondence between Rabun, Jackson and the executive departments and on the 12th President Monroe complied. Monroe later requested Congress seek all documents relating to the Chehaw Affair, which Thomas W. Cobb of Georgia and Abner Lacock of Pennsylvania requested at the President's wishes.

Meanwhile, William McIntosh, in correspondence with Jackson, sought to bring the men who had murdered his uncle (chief of Chehaw) and the inhabitants of the village to justice. He called for an assembly of the Creek nation on June 7, 1819. In the end, Indian Agent David Brydie Mitchell was provided with $10,000 by the U.S. government, with which to compensate the Chehaws.

As for the fate of Wright, he was located and arrested by Major John M. Davis. Davis was forced to release him, however, while passing through the state capital, then located in Milledgeville, on his way to Fort Hawkins after a Georgia Inferior Court ruled in Davis' favor. Once he was released, Governor Rabun had him arrested so that he could be tried by a United States civil court rather than one of Jackson's martial courts. Having received letters urging for both outcomes, President Monroe conferred with Secretaries John Quincy Adams and William H. Crawford on June 26, reaching the conclusion that Wright should fall under the circuit court's jurisdiction unless they should disclaim him.

In the meantime, Wright, unaware of the relative victory in Washington, caught wind of a rumor published in the Savannah Republican that he would be tried before a special court for murder. So, in the darkness of the night on July 27, as Niles' Register reported, Wright "took the fatal resolution to flee from justice" fearing "that his conduct would not be impartially investigated." He was months later spotted one last time by an acquaintance in St. Augustine, Florida on his way to Havana, Cuba.

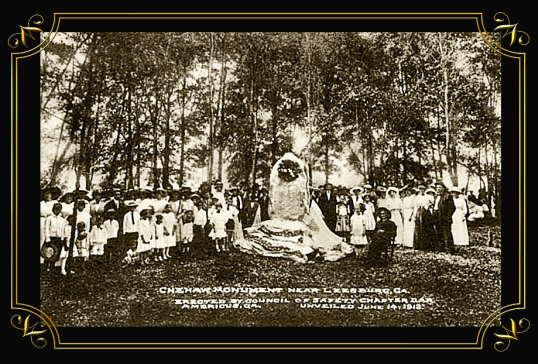
Chehaw Monument near Leesburg, GA

== Legacy ==
In 1912, the Daughters of the American Revolution placed a granite boulder there, where a large oak of purported significance to the Chehaws once stood. Describing the Chehaw as a "friendly agricultural people...who aided our early settlers", it proceeds to (fittingly) put forth its own version of the events: "Here also, in 1818, through misunderstanding, were sacrificed seven of this tribe by Georgia troops, for which all possible amends were made."
