= Coosa Creek =

Stream in Georgia, U.S.

Coordinates: 34.8584206°N 83.9935215°W

Coosa Creek is a stream in the U.S. state of Georgia.

The stream derives its name from the Coosa chiefdom. Many variant names have been recorded, including: "Abacoochee River", "Arbacoochee River", "Coosau River", "Coosaw River", "Coose River", "Coosee River", "Coosey River", "Coosha River", "Cosa River", "Coussa Fiume", "Coussa River", "Cusa River", "Cusha River", "High Tower Creek", "High Town River", "Koosah River", "Koose River", "Koosee River", "Kusa'", and "Kusaw River".
