= Blackshear Trail =

Blackshear Trail is a historic trail made through roadless areas by General David Blackshear during the War of 1812 in what is now Crisp County, Georgia. A State Historical Marker commemorates the trail and is located west of Cordele, Georgia on GA 300 approximately 1 mile southwest of the junction with US 280. The trail was used by General Andrew Jackson from Fort Hawkins (now Macon, Georgia) to travel through Hartford (now Hawkinsville) and on to Fort Early in 1818. Prior to the establishment of the trail, the area contained only Indian trails. The trail was used by General Jackson to fight the Seminole tribe and Creek Indians and the Battle of Skin Cypress Pond was fought on the Blackshear Trail.

== See also ==
- National Register of Historic Places listings in Crisp County, Georgia
