= Dallas phase =

Archaeological phase within the Mississippian III period

The Dallas phase (c. 1300–1600 CE) is an archaeological phase, within the Mississippian III period, in the South Appalachian Geologic province in North America.

== Geography ==
Dallas peoples moved into what is now southwest Virginia from northeastern Tennessee in the early 13th century. Dallas phase settlements ranged from along the Holston River to Cobb Island, and up the Nolichucky River and Little Pigeon Creek in Tennessee, and along the Clinch River in Virginia.

== Characteristics ==
The Dallas phase settlements typically have one to three platform mounds; however, some (40Un11 and 40An44) have no mounds at all. Their society was hierarchical. It is characterized by distinctions between nobles, and commoners in burial practices. Elites were buried in mounds, unlike the remaining population. Artifacts included shell gorgets, ear pins, and beads.

Dallas peoples built "large log houses." Their towns had central plazas, surrounded by winter and summer homes.

=== Ceramics ===
Dallas Ware pottery was tempered with mussel shells and featured lugs, incised decoration, notched fillets, and strap handles. Two distinct styles were Dallas Plain and Dallas Cordmarked.

== Sites ==
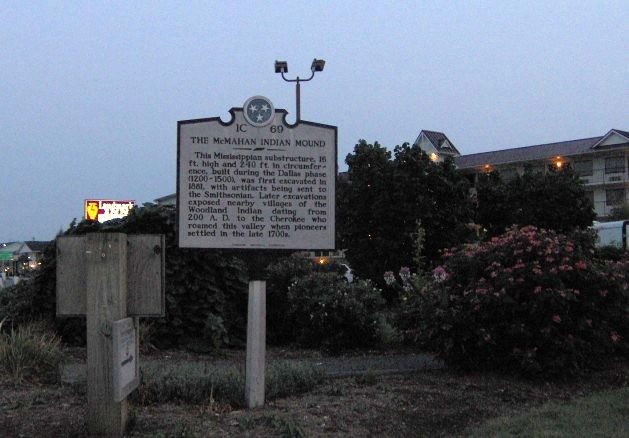
Sign for McMahan Indian Mound

Dallas phase sites include the following:

- Bussell Island (40LD17), Loudon County, Tennessee
- Chiaha, Jefferson County, Tennessee
- Citico (40HA65), Chattanooga, Hamilton County, Tennessee
- Cox site (40AN19), Anderson County, Tennessee
- David Davis Site (40HA301), Hamilton County, Tennessee
- DeArmond Site (40RE12), Roane County, Tennessee
- Fain's Island (40JE1), Jefferson County, Tennessee
- Henderson Site (40SV4), Sevier County, Tennessee
- Henry Farm Site (40LD53), Loudon County, Tennessee
- Hiwassee Island Site (40MG31), Meigs County, Tennessee
- Hixon Site (40HA3), Hamilton County, Tennessee
- McMahan Mound Site (40SV1), Sevier County, Tennessee
- Toqua (40MR6), Monroe County, Tennessee

Overhill Cherokee sites, such as Citico (40Mr7), Hiwassee Old Town (40Pk3), and Chilhowee (40Bt7) have Dallas phase artifacts; however, the Dallas phase is associated with ancestral Muscogee Creek peoples.

== Dates ==
In the same region, the Hiwassee Island phase ran from 1000 to 1250 CE, followed by Early Dallas from 1250–1450 CE. Late Dallas ranged from 1450–1650 CE, which was followed by the Overhill Cherokee and Mouse Creek phases.

== See also ==
- List of archaeological sites in Tennessee
