= McMahan Mound Site =

Archaeological site in Tennessee, US

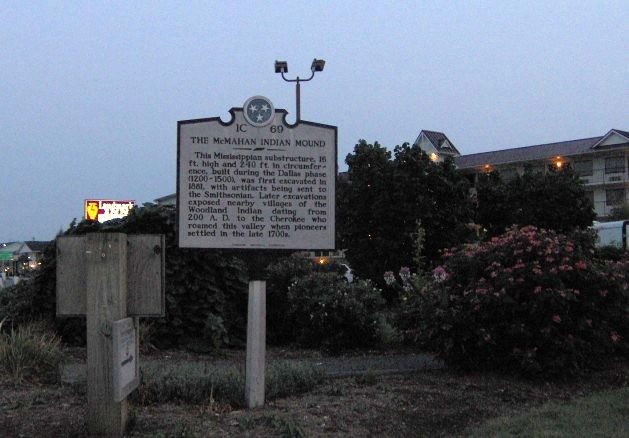
- Tennessee Historical Commission sign marking the site of the McMahan Mound

- Location within Tennessee today
- 35°51′49.93″N 83°34′3.9″W
- Periods: Dallas phase
- Cultures: South Appalachian Mississippian culture
- Location: Sevierville, Tennessee, Sevier County, Tennessee, USA
- Region: Sevier County, Tennessee

History
- Built: 1200 CE
- Abandoned: 1500 CE

Site notes
- Architectural style: platform mound Number of temples: 1
- Excavation dates: 1881
- Archaeologists: William H. Holmes

The McMahan Mound Site (40SV1), also known as McMahan Indian Mound, is an archaeological site located in Sevierville, Tennessee just above the confluence of the West Fork and the Little Pigeon rivers in Sevier County.

== Site description ==
The site consists of a 16 feet (5 m) high and 240 feet (73 m) wide platform mound, with a large associated village surrounded by a palisade. It was occupied by Dallas phase peoples of the South Appalachian Mississippian culture between 1200 and 1500 CE. At the time when the ancient mound was first investigated scientifically in 1881 by a party associated with the Smithsonian Institution, the earthwork was located on a farm owned by the McMahan family. The mound is now named for that family.

== Excavations ==
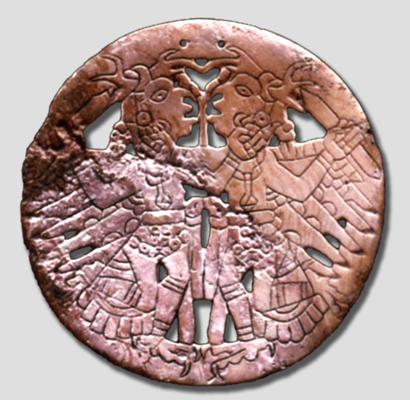
Birdman gorget from Hixon Site similar to one found at McMahan

Excavations by William H. Holmes in 1881 unearthed burials, arrow-points, a marble pipe, Mississippian culture pottery, and numerous engraved shell gorgets and columnella pendants. Several items of European manufacture were also found in the excavations, including brass pins and cylindrical glass beads. These suggested that the mound site had been inhabited during the time of European contact in the American Southeast.

One fragmentary engraved shell gorget found during the excavations was particularly noteworthy. It depicts two S.E.C.C. "Birdmen" with wings and talons for feet, grasping each other by the neck with one hand and wielding ceremonial flint blades with the other. This type of gorget is carved in what is now known as the Hightower style. Holmes also uncovered several "rattlesnake" and mask-style gorgets, as well as a curious gorget with looping lines that Holmes described as "very interesting object.....The figure is so obscure that considerable study is necessary in making it out." These pieces are in the styles now known as the Lick Creek style and Citico style for the rattlesnake gorgets, Chickamauga style for the mask-like gorgets, and Williams Island or Spaghetti style for the last.
