= Chehaw, Georgia =

Unincorporated community in Georgia, U.S.

Coordinates: 31°42′31″N 84°03′02″W

Chehaw is an unincorporated community in Lee County, in the U.S. state of Georgia.

The community takes its name from the Chiaha, or Chehaw, a tribe of Creek Native Americans, who once settled at this site.

== See also ==
- Chehaw Affair, or Chehaw Massacre, in 1818
