= Mississippian shatter zone =

Region of Native American instability in 1540–1730

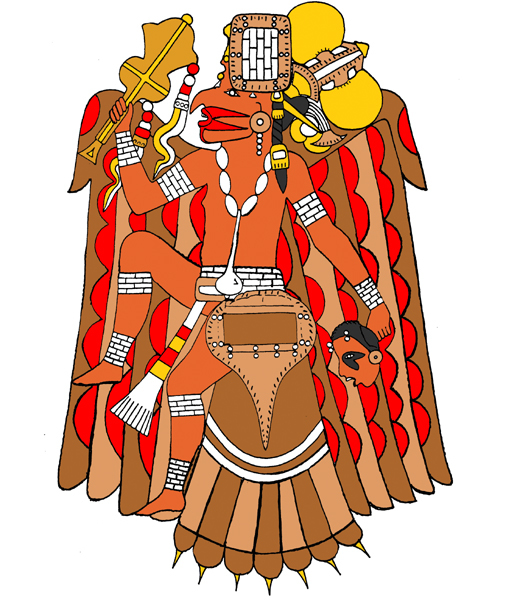
Mississippian birdman from the Etowah Indian Mounds, Georgia.

The Mississippian shatter zone describes the period from 1540 to 1730 in the southeastern part of the present United States. During that time, the interaction between European explorers and colonists transformed the Native American cultures of that region. In 1540 dozens of chiefdoms and several paramount chiefdoms were scattered throughout the southeast. Chiefdoms featured a noble class ruling a large number of commoners and were characterized by villages and towns with large earthen mounds and complex religious practices. Some chiefdoms, known as paramount chieftains, ruled or influenced large areas. The chiefdoms were ravaged in the mid-16th century by the Spanish exploratory missions of de Soto and others, initiating an irrevocable decline.

The chiefdoms all disappeared by 1730. The most important factor in their gradual disappearance was the chaos induced by slave raids and the enslavement of tens of thousands of Indians. Other factors included epidemics of diseases of European origin and wars among themselves and with European colonists. The trade in slaves was stimulated by the demand of British colonists for slaves and the demand of the Indians for guns and other manufactured products. Some tribes, especially the Westo, specialized in capturing Indians to be enslaved. English and Indian raids on Spanish colonies in Florida and Georgia resulted in a larger number of captured Indians who became slaves. Indian slaves usually ended up working on plantations in the U.S. or were exported to islands in the Caribbean Sea. The city of Charleston, South Carolina was the most important slave market.

The Indian population in the southeast decreased from an estimated 500,000 in 1540 to 90,000 in 1730. The chiefdoms were replaced by simpler coalescent tribes and confederacies made up of survivors and refugees from the fragmented chiefdoms, plus migrants from other areas who fled wars with the English and the Iroquois. These included tribes prominent in 18th and 19th U.S. history such as the Muscogee Creek, Cherokee, Choctaw, Chickasaw, Yuchi, Yamassee, and Catawba.

== Prehistory ==
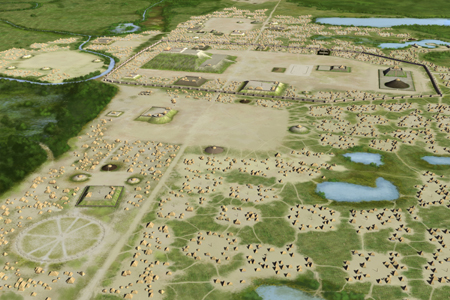
An artist's conception of Cahokia.

From 1000 to 1600 CE, the Mississippian culture of the American Indian people flourished in much of what would later become the southern and mid-western United States. The early Mississippian culture (1000 to 1300 CE) featured the rise of Cahokia, located in East St. Louis, Illinois. Cahokia became the largest city north of Mesoamerica covering an area of 14.5 km^{2} (5.6 sq mi) and with a population estimated at between 10,000 and 15,000 people. The fall of Cahokia about 1300 CE initiated the Middle Mississippian Culture (1300 to 1475 CE) which saw the influence of Cahokia reflected in a large number of smaller chiefdoms. The most extensive remains of a chiefdom during this period are found at the Moundville Archaeological Site near Tuscaloosa, Alabama with a population of 1,000 people in the town and 10,000 people nearby in the river valley which it governed. The chiefdoms of this period collapsed about 1450, possibly because of drought, and a new group emerged to characterize the Late Mississippian period from 1475 to 1600, by which time a European presence in the United States had begun to impact the Mississippian peoples. The period between first contact of the traditional chiefdoms with the Europeans in 1540 until the demise of the Mississippian culture in 1730 is called a "shatter zone" by scholars.

The Mississippian people numbered about 500,000 at the time of first contact with Europeans in 1540. They resided in inland areas from the Carolinas west to Arkansas and south from Virginia. They were divided among dozens of chiefdoms. The average chiefdom had a population of 2,800 to 5,400 people of whom 350 to 650 lived in the main town, characterized by large earthen mounds. The mico or chief lived atop the biggest mound and others in the leadership lived atop smaller mounds. The common citizens lived in houses among the mounds. An average chiefdom controlled an area of about 20 km (12 mi) along a river. Wars among chiefdoms were common. An unoccupied buffer zone approximately 33 km (21 mi) wide separated the lands of one chiefdom from another. The chiefdoms engaged in trade of products such as copper and flintstones. Most of the people were farmers. Their most important crop was maize.

Many of the chiefdoms were part of one of several "paramount chiefdoms" which controlled or influenced several chiefdoms. The largest paramount chiefdom was perhaps Coosa which encompassed an area 300 mi (480 km) long along the Coosa and Tennessee Rivers from Alabama to northern Tennessee and had an estimated population as large as 50,000 people.

== Definition ==
Scholar Robbie Ethridge said that the Mississippian shatter zone was characterized by the growth in commercial trade in animal skins and slaves between Indians and Europeans, the encroachments of Europeans, the loss of Indian lives caused by epidemics of European diseases, and increased violence and warfare caused in part by the demand of the Europeans for Indian slaves and the demand of Indians for European products. The consequence was chaos and the destruction of the Mississippian chiefdoms from the time of de Soto until 1730. They were replaced by tribes and confederacies created by the survivors and refugees of Mississippian culture.

The shatter zone from 1540 to 1730 comprised part of Virginia, North and South Carolina, Georgia, Northern Florida, Alabama, Tennessee, Mississippi, Arkansas, and part of Louisiana. Most of the chiefdoms were located inland rather than near the coasts of the Atlantic Ocean and the Gulf of Mexico due to the more fertile soils for agriculture in the hinterland as compared to the coasts.

== First contacts ==
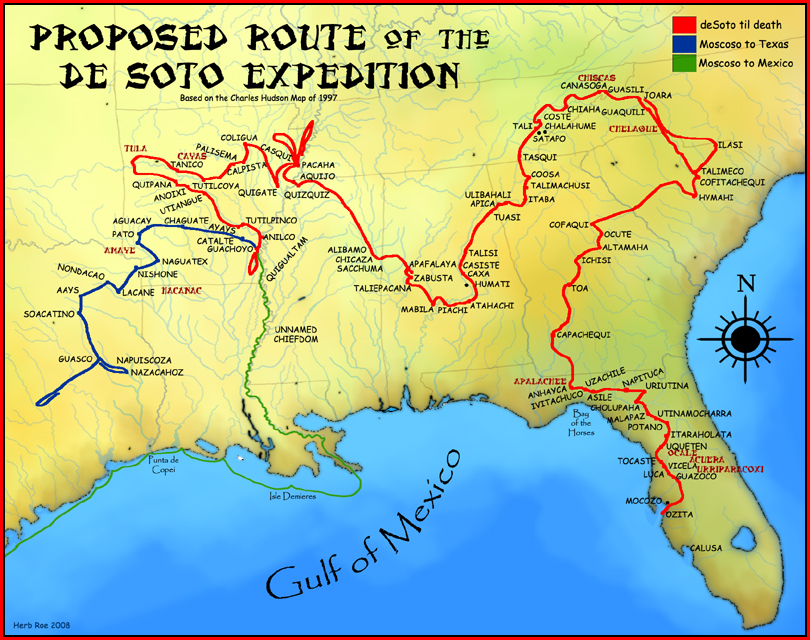

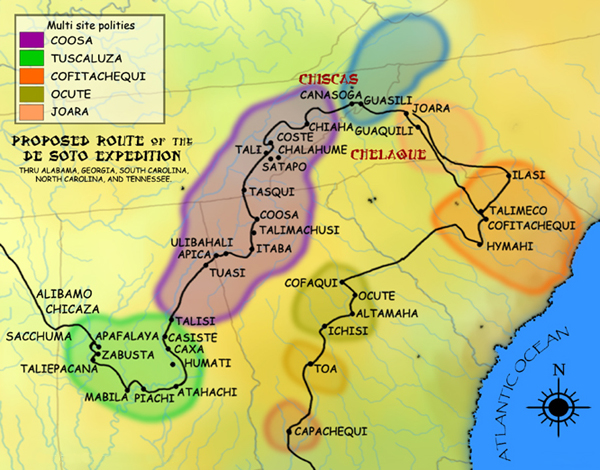
Paramount chiefdoms encountered by DeSoto in Georgia, the Carolinas, Tennessee, and Alabama.

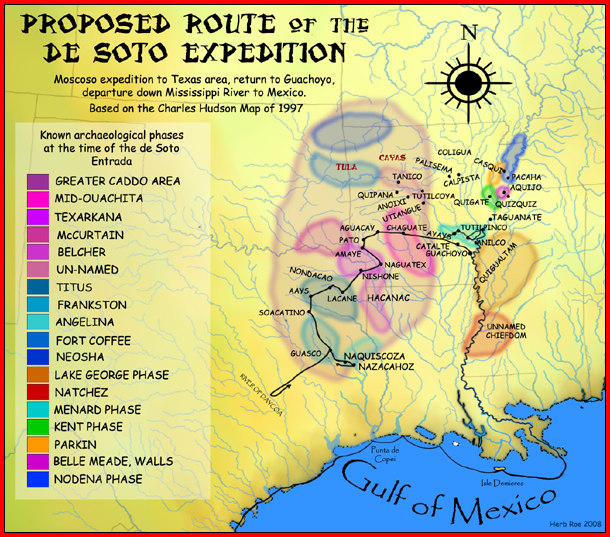
Paramount chiefdoms encountered by DeSoto in Arkansas, Tennessee, Mississippi, Texas, and Oklahoma.

Hernando de Soto and 620 Spanish soldiers (along with hundreds of horses, dogs, and pigs) traveled a circuitous route through nine southern states from 1539 to 1542 searching for wealth. They encountered many of the chiefdoms of the Mississippians. Among those chiefdoms de Soto visited were Ocute, Cofitachequi (probably located near Camden, South Carolina), the easternmost chiefdom of the Mississippians; Joara (probably near Morganton, North Carolina) one of the most northern of the chiefdoms; Coosa (located along the Coosawattee River in northwest Georgia; Tuscaluza (near Tuscallusa, Alabama) where de Soto fought the largest battle of his expedition at the town of Mabila; and Tula (probably in Yell County, Arkansas), near the western limits of the Mississippians. De Soto created havoc in this passage, killing and enslaving Indians, confiscating food supplies to feed his soldiers, and possibly spreading European diseases among the people he encountered, although no firm evidence of epidemics among the natives as a result of de Soto's passage has been found.

In 1559–1560, a Spanish expedition headed by Tristán de Luna y Arellano attempted to found a colony on Pensacola Bay, Florida. Knowing that the de Soto expedition had encountered rich towns in the interior, de Luna sent an expedition of 150 men inland to find food for the distressed colony. The expedition reached a town called Nanipacana nine to twelve days walk inland (probably near the present day town of Camden, Alabama). Nanipacana was possibly a successor of the chiefdom of Mabila which Desoto had destroyed 20 years earlier. As the Spanish advanced, the Mississippians abandoned Nanipacana, taking their stored food with them. Still in need of food and looking for a place to establish a viable settlement, the Spanish continued north to the homeland of the Coosa paramount chiefdom. The Spaniards were disappointed in the meager results of their expedition, soon departed Coosa, and abandoned de Luna's colony on Pensacola Bay. The Spanish noted that the inhabitants of Nanipacana and Coosa spoke different languages identified by Charles M. Hudson as Choctaw for Nanipacana and Muskogee (Creek) for Coosa.

In 1566–1568, Juan Pardo led two Spanish expeditions starting in South Carolina, crossing the Appalachian Mountains of North Carolina and reaching the French Broad River in Tennessee in the vicinity of what would become the city of Knoxville. He followed roughly the same route as had de Soto through North Carolina, visiting Joara (probably near Morganton, North Carolina). Joara and its vicinity was inhabited by the Cherokee people. In Tennessee the most important chiefdom he visited was called Chiaha, the northernmost outpost of the territory dominated by the Coosa paramount chiefdom. The location of Chiaha was on Zimmerman Island, now submerged beneath the waters behind Douglas Dam. The Chiaha were speakers of a Muskogee language, which was probably true of most or all of the peoples dominated by Coosa. Pardo established six forts along his route staffed by 120 men, but the Indians soon killed them all and burned the forts.

The failure of the de Soto, de Luna, and Pardo expeditions to find any source of readily available wealth led to the Spanish abandoning their attempts to settle among and control the Mississippians. St. Augustine (founded 1565) in Florida became the center of the much-reduced Spanish activity in the inland areas of the southeastern United States. After the three Spanish expeditions, little is known of the Mississippians for the next hundred years.

== Disappearance of the chiefdoms ==
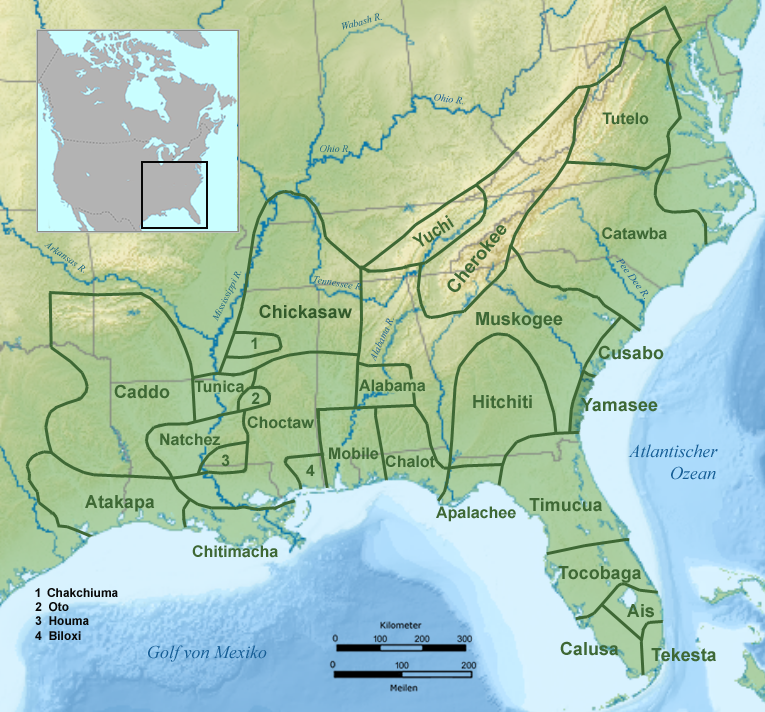
Location of Indian tribes and confederations in the southeast c. 1700.

The Coosa paramount chiefdom fragmented before 1600, with only a remnant of the original chiefdom remaining in northern Alabama. In the 1620s people of the Chiscas chiefdom from northeastern Tennessee and southwestern Virginia migrated, for unknown reasons, hundreds of miles south to northern Florida. The Powhatan confederacy in Virginia ceased to exist about 1650 due to wars with the English colonists. Cofitachequi continued to exercise control over a large area of South Carolina until at least 1672. The chroniclers of DeSoto agreed that the largest and most impressive of the chiefdoms were near the Mississippi River in Tennessee, Mississippi, and Arkansas. These chiefdoms began to disappear by about 1650 and were largely gone when the next foreign visitors, the French, visited the area in 1673. The last surviving Mississippian chiefdom, the Natchez, was defeated in a war with the French in 1731.

== Slavery ==
Historian Alan Gallay said that the "trade in Indian slaves was the most important factor affecting the South in the period 1670 to 1715: its impact was felt from Arkansas to the Carolinas and south to the Florida Keys."

The founding of English settlements in Virginia in 1607 and South Carolina in 1670 resulted in a demand for American Indian slaves. By 1649, the enslavement of Indian children was common In Virginia. In South Carolina, plantation laborers were needed and Indian slaves, along with African slaves, met that need. An estimated 30,000 to 50,000 Indians were enslaved in Virginia and the Carolinas between 1670 and 1715. Many of them were sold and shipped to islands in the Caribbean Sea to work on English plantations there. In the words of scholar Andrés Reséndez, "In the period between 1670 and 1720, Carolinians exported more Indians out of Charleston, South Carolina, than they imported Africans into it."

Slave raiders mostly took captured Indian women and children to sell as slaves. Men and the youngest and oldest people were usually killed in the raids. This contrasts with the market for African slaves in which most of those arriving in the Americas were men.

The magnitude of the slave trade contributed to the decline of Indian populations. The Indian population in the "South" (not defined as to precise area) has been estimated at 199,000 in 1685, but only 90,000 in 1715. The decline in Indian populations was partially due to slavery, but also as a consequence of the Smallpox epidemic of 1696 which decimated many Indian peoples who lacked immunity to this disease of European origin. The spread of smallpox was facilitated by the widespread travels of Indian slavers and their slaves.

Moreover, the slave trade resulted in a realignment of power among the Indian peoples of the southeast. In the 1640s and 1650s the Iroquois of New York waged war against the surrounding peoples. The Iroquois motive for the Beaver Wars was to gain control of trade with the French, Dutch, and English colonies in their region. They defeated the Erie people who lived on the south shore of Lake Erie in the mid-1650s and some of the survivors migrated south to the English colony of Virginia where they were called "Richaherians." Subsequently, they moved to the Savannah River on the border of South Carolina and Georgia where they were called the Westo. In the 1670s the Westo captured and sold slaves in South Carolina. After the South Carolinians and the "Savannah" (Shawnee) defeated the Westo in a 1682 war, the Shawnee replaced them as suppliers of slaves to the English. The Shawnee were also refugees from the Iroquois, having moved south about 1674. Other important slaving tribes in the late 17th century were the Yamasseee of Georgia and South Carolina and the Chickasaw-based near present-day Tupelo, Mississippi, 800 km (500 mi) west of Charleston. The Chickasaw expanded the slave raiding area to the lower Mississippi River valley.

The logic of the slave trade was that to survive in a violence-ridden, shattering society, Indian tribes needed guns and a way to get guns was to trade slaves for them to the South Carolinians. Thus, for their own protection and survival tribes participated in the slave trade.

=== Spanish Florida and Georgia ===
The Spanish colony of St. Augustine, Florida was founded in 1565 and over the next century Catholic missionaries founded a dozen missions in northern Florida and coastal Georgia. Assigned to the missions were small number of Spanish soldiers. By 1650, the Spanish missions had a population of more that 25,000 Indians from the Timucua, Apalachee, and Guale tribes. In 1661, the Westos began assaulting the Spanish missions and capturing slaves. After the foundation of South Carolina in 1670, the white colonists joined with the Westo in raiding the Spanish missions. By the 1680s the Georgia coast was depopulated and a coalescent people called the Yamassee made up of the remnants of the Guale and other peoples had come into existence. In 1683, the Yamassee, in cooperation with white colonists in South Carolina, began to launch slave raids into Spanish Florida. The attempts of the Spanish to halt the slave raids were ineffective. The Lower Creeks soon joined the Yamassee in the raids.

In 1702, 500 Yamassee and Creek warriors joined white colonists from South Carolina in raiding northeastern Florida and in 1704, in what is called the Apalachee massacre, 1,000 Creeks and 50 English colonists decimated the Apalachee who lived near present-day Tallahassee, enslaving more than 1,000 Apalachee. In raids from 1704 to 1707, an estimated 10,000 to 12,000 women and children from Spanish Florida were enslaved. By 1711, Florida was depopulated, with many refugees fleeing to Cuba and others taking refuge in the surviving town of St. Augustine.

== Epidemics and the decline of the Indian slave trade ==
While it is possible that earlier undocumented epidemics impacted the Indian population, the "Great Southeastern Smallpox Epidemic" from 1696 to 1715 had a severe impact on both white and Indian populations of the southeast, but especially on the Indians who had no inherited immunity to this disease of European origin. The epidemic began in Virginia in 1696 and spread along trading paths, reaching the Tunica in Louisiana in 1699. Recurrent epidemics occurred until 1715. A South Carolinian said "the Small-pox hath killed so many of them that we have little Reason to believe they will be Capable of doing any Harm to us for severall Years to Come." Scholars estimate that the deaths caused by the epidemic may have reduced populations of some Indian tribes by more than 60 percent. The deaths caused by the epidemics impacted the slave trade as there were fewer Indians to be captured and enslaved. South Carolinian slave traders responded to the reduction in their supply of potential slaves by forcing Indian tribes to hand over people to them who the tribes did not wish to see enslaved. The Indian resistance to the aggressive traders led to the Yamassee War in South Carolina from 1715 to 1717.

The slave trade in Indians mostly ended after the Yamassee War. The Yamassee and their allies killed most of the English slave traders, the colonial governments took steps to regulate the colony's trading relationships with Indian tribes, and many Indian tribes, such as the Yamassee, continued to be anti-British after the war and established better relations with the Spanish and French. Several of the important southeastern Indian tribes learned to balance their relationships with the colonial powers, trading and accepting gifts from all, but establishing alliances with none.

== Coalescence ==
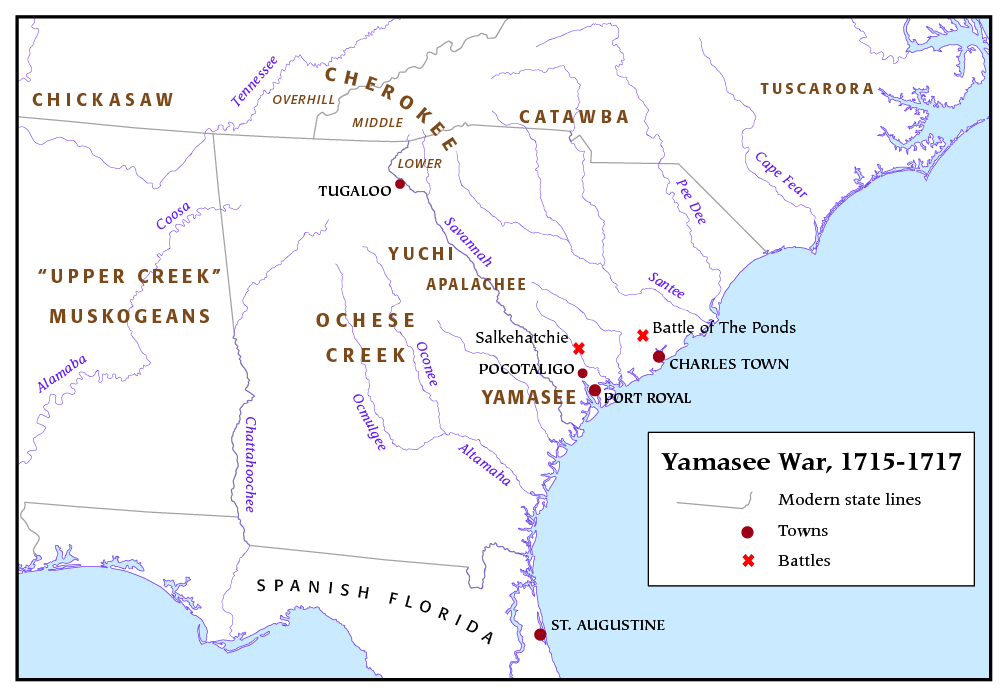
Southeastern tribes during the Yamassee War, 1715–1717.

The shattering of the chiefdoms dominating the southeast began with DeSoto's expedition in the 1540s and continued through the ravages of war, slavery, and smallpox until about 1730 by which time none of the Mississippian chiefdoms survived. Although many of the customs of the Mississippians continued, the peoples succeeding the Mississippians ceased building mounds and elevating their leaders to divine status. They simplified religious practices and became integrated into a trade system with European colonists exchanging deerskins and slaves for guns and other manufactured products. Indians began to practice a variety of occupations: "guide, translator, mercenary, postal rider, horse thief, slave catcher, prostitute, etc." The southeastern Indians adapted to new conditions. Mixed marriages and relationships between Indians and whites and Indians and Africans created people who moved between cultures and would often rise to positions of leadership in the coalescent societies that followed the demise of the Mississippians.

In the early 1700s European settlement in the United States was still sparse and mostly near the coasts with the Indian peoples in control of the very large hinterland. In 1700, the white and slave population of the whole United States is estimated at only 275,000 and most of that was concentrated in the northeastern United States, not the southeast. The white and slave population of South Carolina is estimated at 150 in 1670. It increased to 7,000 in 1700, including 3,000 slaves (many of whom were Indian), and increasing thereafter to 30,000 in 1730, including 20,000 slaves of whom the great majority were now African. The point is that in the early 18th century the Indian population of South Carolina and other parts of the southeast was as numerous or more numerous than the English colonists and interacted with the colonists as equals—or from a position of power.

The coalescent tribes and confederacies of the 18th century until the present were made up of survivors of the declining chiefdoms, refugees from tribes defeated or displaced by war, and people migrating into the southeast from other regions. They spoke multiple languages and had different customs. The confederacies of the varied peoples were held together by the need to protect themselves from slave raids and, increasingly, from the encroachments of European colonists onto their lands. The tribes and confederacies created during this period of coalescence were the Catawba in the Carolinas, the Creek in Alabama and Georgia, the Choctaw and Chickasaw in Mississippi, Cherokee in the Appalachian Mountains, Yamassee in Georgia, Yuchi in Tennessee, Tunica in Louisiana, and the Caddoan confederacies of the trans-Mississippi west.

== See also ==
- Mfecane
- Guaraní War
  - Bandeirantes
- Angolan Wars
  - Imbangala
- Pays d'en Haut
  - Beaver Wars
  - Fox Wars
