= Bussell Island =

- Bussell Island Site
- U.S. National Register of Historic Places
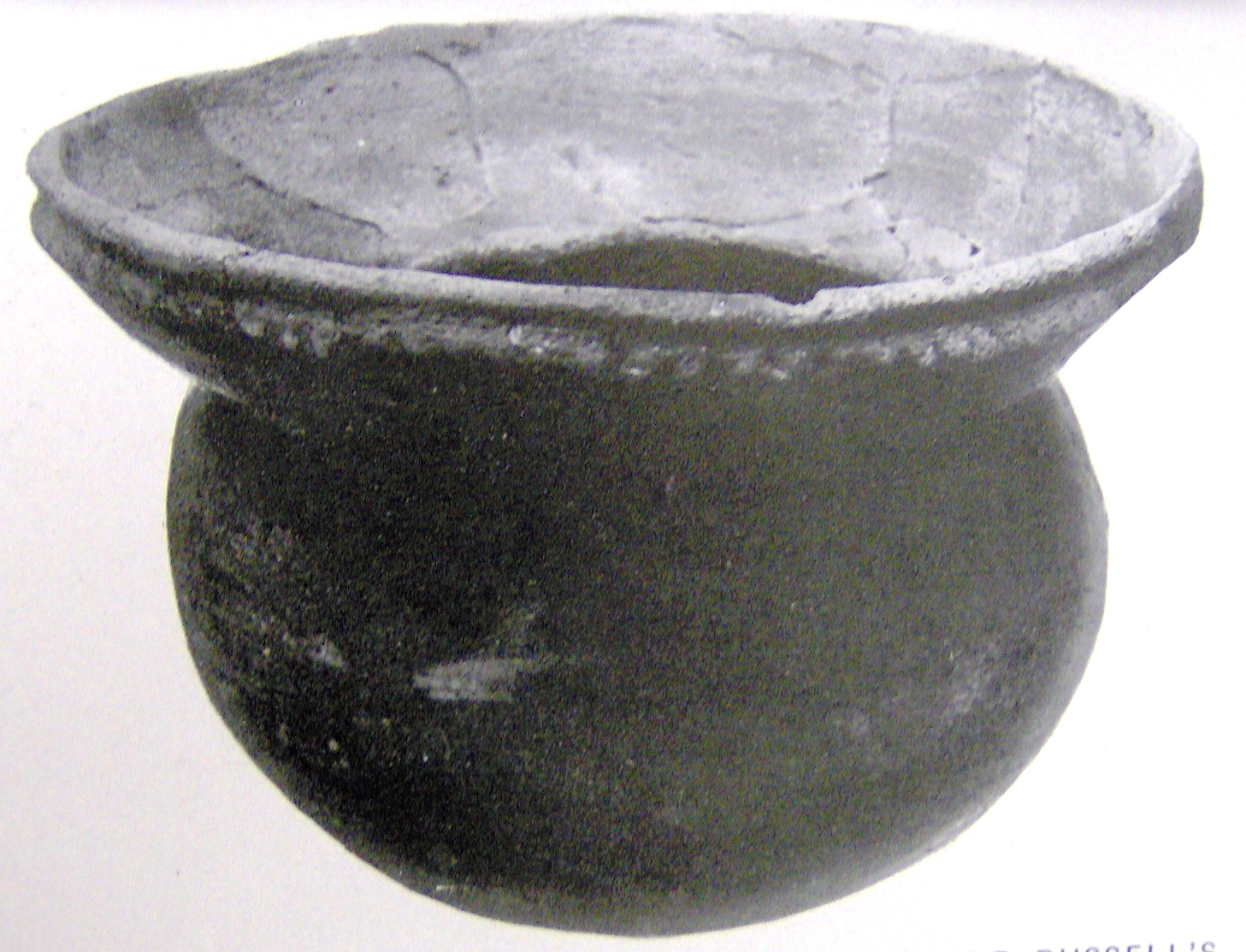
- Ceramic bowl unearthed from the "Round Grave" on Bussell Island, 6.2" diameter
- Location: Loudon County, Tennessee
- Nearest city: Lenoir City, Tennessee
- Coordinates: 35°46′49″N 84°15′22″W
- NRHP reference No.: 78002606
- Added to NRHP: March 29, 1978

Bussell Island, formerly Lenoir Island, is an island located at the mouth of the Little Tennessee River, at its confluence with the Tennessee River in Loudon County, near the U.S. city of Lenoir City, Tennessee. The island was inhabited by various Native American cultures for thousands of years before the arrival of early European explorers. The Tellico Dam and a recreational area occupy part of the island. Part of the island was added in 1978 to the National Register of Historic Places for its archaeological potential.

Native American habitation of Bussell Island dates to the Late Archaic period (c. 3000–1000 BC). The island is believed to have been the location of the capital of Coste—a Mississippian-period chiefdom visited by Spanish explorer Hernando de Soto in 1540—and was later part of the domain of the Overhill Cherokee and the regional homelands of the Cherokee people.

In 1887 and 1919, archaeologists conducted extensive excavations at Bussell Island and identified its archaeological importance. The island was drastically modified in the 1970s when the Tennessee Valley Authority (TVA) built Tellico Dam.

== Location ==
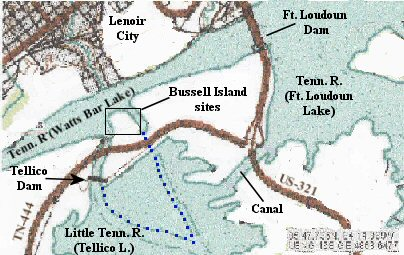
Bussell Island vicinity, with the dotted blue line showing the island's original east and southwest shorelines

Bussell Island is situated where the Little Tennessee River joins the Tennessee River, just over 601 miles (967 km) upstream from the mouth of the latter. The island originally stretched for about a mile up the Little Tennessee, but the construction of Tellico Dam across the island's west river channel in the 1970s created a reservoir that flooded the southern two-thirds of the island. To contain the reservoir, an earthen levee was built along the island's new south shore and across the island's east river channel, connecting the island to the mainland. TVA's construction of a canal connecting the Tellico and Fort Loudoun reservoirs severed this section of the mainland, thus creating a new island that stretches for about a mile east-to-west, and touches three TVA lakes: Fort Loudoun, Watts Bar, and Tellico.

Lenoir City is located along the Tennessee River opposite Bussell Island. U.S. Route 321 (Lamar Alexander Parkway) crosses the island's new eastern half, and State Route 444 (Tellico Parkway) traverses the center of the island, with the two roads intersecting on the island's eastern tip. US-321 crosses via the J. Carmichael Bridge, which spans both Fort Loudoun Dam and the canal.

John W. Emmert, who conducted excavations on the island in 1887 for the Smithsonian Institution, stated that the original island covered 200 acres (81 ha), and rose to a maximum of 15 feet (4.6 m) above the river. Emmert described the island's banks as "steep" with "heavy timber and much cane growing along them." Emmert also noted that the island was occasionally submerged when the Little Tennessee flooded, and noted that his excavation work was interrupted by one such flood which submerged the island to upwards of 12 feet (3.7 m).

== History ==
=== Prehistory ===
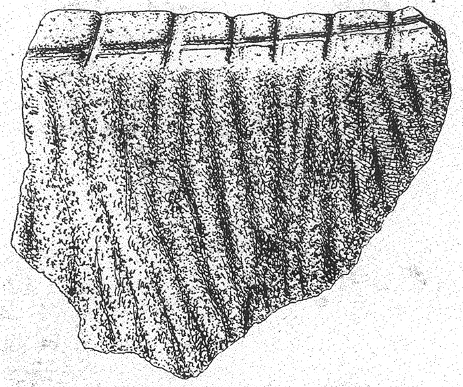
Steatite vessel fragment belonging to the "Round Grave" people, uncovered in 1919

The earliest known inhabitants of Bussell Island lived during the Late Archaic period (c. 3000–1000 BC), and occupied the island sporadically throughout the Woodland period (1000 BC – 1000 AD). Archaeologist Mark R. Harrington, who conducted extensive excavations in the area in 1919 for the Heye Foundation, called these early inhabitants "Round Grave" people, due to their practice of burying their dead in small, round graves. The Round Grave people used tools made of animal bone and stone, and used both steatite vessels and simple pottery.

The successors to the Round Grave people at Bussell Island were a people Harrington simply called the "Second Culture." This culture was part of what is now known as the Mississippian culture, which flourished in the upper Tennessee Valley between 900 and 1600 AD. The Mississippian people of the upper Tennessee Valley are known for building large, earthwork platform mounds and conical burial mounds, including several found on Bussell Island and the surrounding mainland. Bussell Island's Mississippian inhabitants used triangular flint arrowheads, celt axes, and wore ornaments made from copper and seashells (the latter suggesting trade with coastal regions).

=== Coste ===
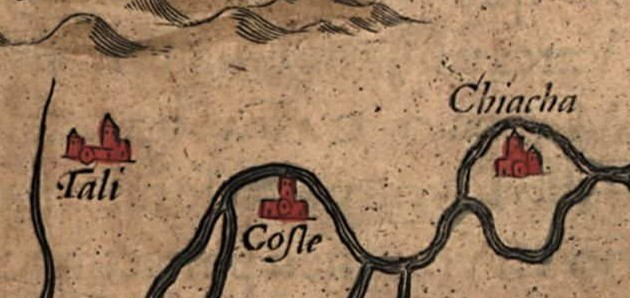
Detail from Chiaves' 1584 map of "La Florida," showing Chiaha, Coste, and Tali

In 1540, Spanish explorer Hernando de Soto embarked on an expedition across what is now the Southeastern United States, then called "La Florida," in hopes of finding an interior route to Mexico. Marching north from Florida, De Soto passed through modern South Carolina and North Carolina before turning west and crossing the Blue Ridge Mountains via the Nolichucky Valley into East Tennessee. After resting for several weeks at the prominent village of Chiaha (near modern Douglas Dam), De Soto continued down the French Broad River and Tennessee River to the village of Coste, centered around Bussell Island. He reached its outskirts on July 1, 1540.

De Soto held a friendly meeting with the chief of Coste on July 2, but relations quickly soured after the Spaniards pillaged some of the Costeans' storehouses, and several Costeans attacked the Spaniards with clubs. De Soto devised a ruse in which he kidnapped the chief and held him hostage for several days. After the chief promised to assign guides and porters to the expedition, De Soto departed on July 9. The expedition continued up the Little Tennessee to the village of Tali (near modern Vonore), and eventually found its way south to Coosa, a chiefdom in northern Georgia.

The inhabitants of Coste, like the inhabitants of Chiaha, spoke a Muskogean language similar to that used by the later Muscogee (Creek) and Koasati tribes. (Linguist Charles Hudson suggests that the term "Koasati" may have been derived from "Coste"). Coste was probably part of the Coosa chiefdom's sphere of influence, which stretched from the upper Tennessee Valley south into central Alabama. In 1567, another Spanish explorer, Juan Pardo, visited the villages of Chalahume and Satapo further up the Little Tennessee Valley, but turned back before reaching Coste.

=== Cherokee and Euro-American history ===
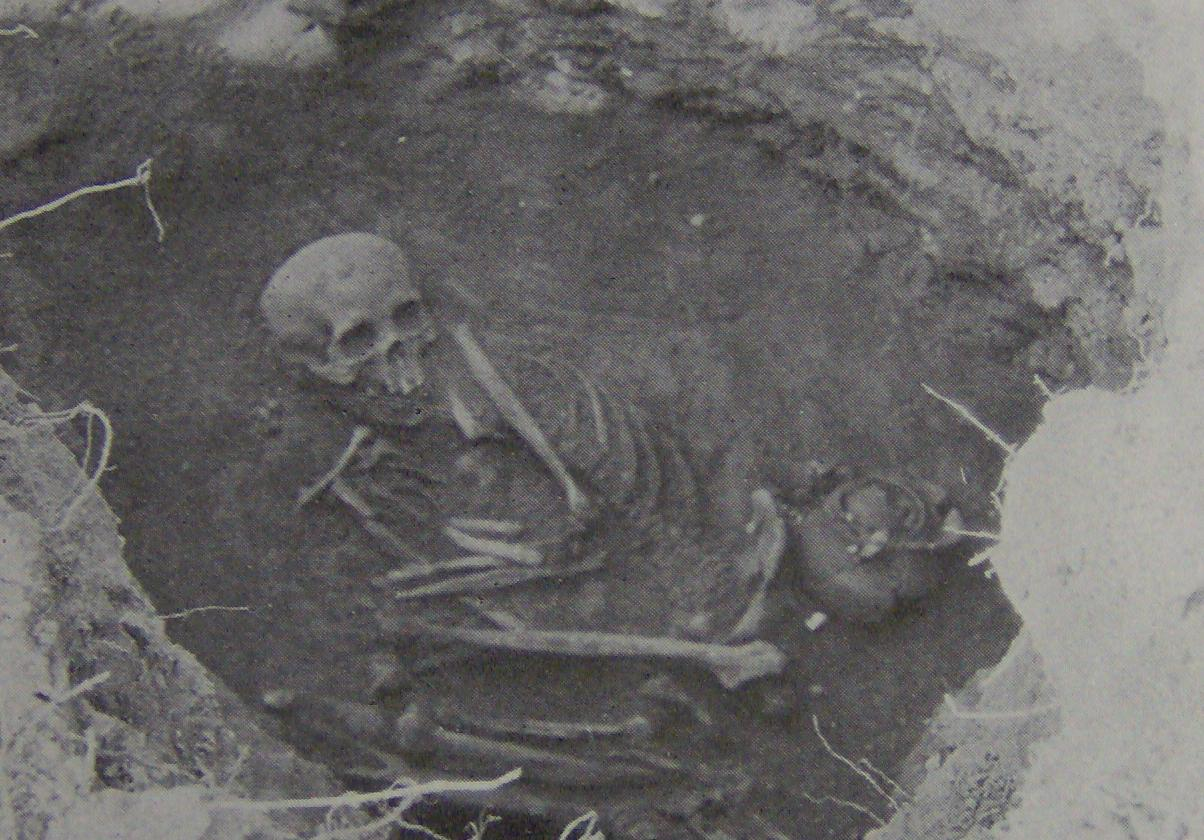
Cherokee grave, excavated in 1919

In the mid-18th century, more than a dozen Cherokee villages—known to English colonists as the Overhill towns, because they were west of the Appalachian mountains—had developed along the lower 55 miles (89 km) of the Little Tennessee River, among them the villages of Chota and Tanasi. The village of Mialoquo, the lowermost of the Overhill towns, was located about 17 miles (27 km) upstream from Bussell Island. Henry Timberlake, an Anglo-American colonist who had traveled up the Little Tennessee in 1761 on a peace mission, met a Cherokee head man named Slave Catcher near the mouth of the Little Tennessee. While his memoir and map were detailed, Timberlake did not refer to the island.

Throughout most of the 19th century, Bussell Island was known as "Lenoir Island," after William Ballard Lenoir, who established a large plantation and cotton mill at what is now Lenoir City. In 1887, John W. Emmert conducted the first major excavations at Bussell Island for the U.S. Bureau of Ethnology. By the time Harrington excavated the island in 1919, the island had come into the possession of the Bussell family, who operated a ferry along the opposite river shore in Lenoir City. Harrington excavated numerous Cherokee graves—identified by the graves' "rectangular" shape and the presence of European trade goods such as glass beads from the period of trading with European-American colonists and settlers. But no known major Cherokee villages were located on the island.

=== Tellico Dam project ===
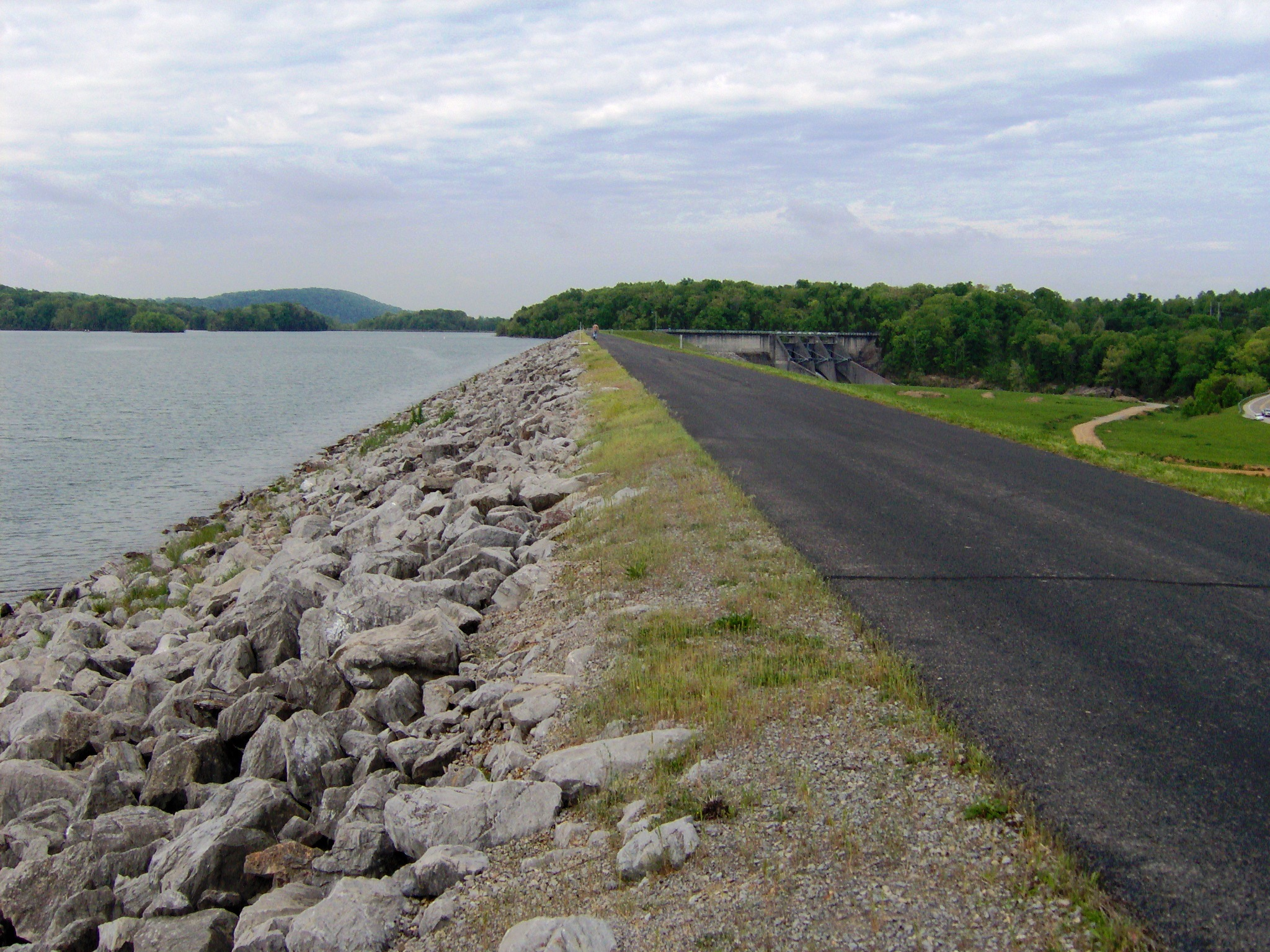
Earthen levee along Bussell Island's new south shoreline

In the 1930s, the Tennessee Valley Authority was established and charged with building a series of dams to generate hydroelectricity and control flooding through the region. They initially proposed to build Fort Loudoun Dam downstream from the mouth of the Little Tennessee, thus creating a reservoir that would expand across both the upper Tennessee River and lower Little Tennessee River. Engineers were unable to locate a suitable downstream site for a dam. They instead built the dam about a mile upstream, planning to build it at the mouth of the Little Tennessee—known as the Fort Loudoun Extension—to divert water to the Fort Loudoun reservoir and increase that dam's generating capacity. Due to lack of funding, however, the Fort Loudoun Extension project was shelved until the 1960s.

TVA revived interest in the Fort Loudoun Extension—renamed the Tellico Dam project—in 1964. They met immediate opposition from a group of citizen activists, who included environmentalists, historical conservationists, and Native Americans with different interests and perspectives on such an infrastructure project. Construction of the dam began in 1969, but litigation stalled its completion until 1979. The University of Tennessee was hired to conduct extensive archeological excavations at sites throughout the Tellico Basin. As a result of the survey and these excavations, several sites were added to the National Register of Historic Places for their archaeological potential, among them Bussell Island, designated 40LD17.

== Excavations ==
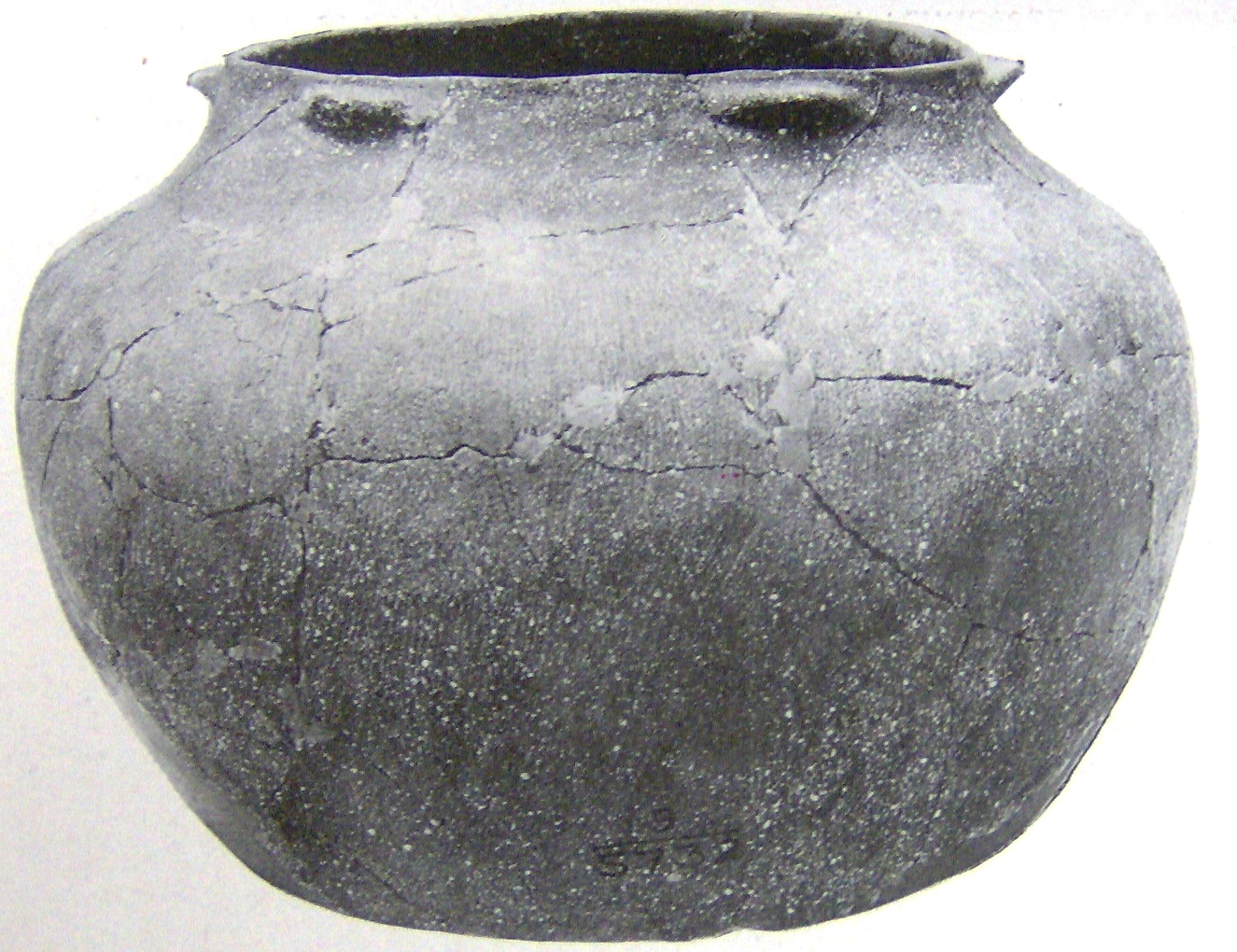
Pottery vessel uncovered by Harrington in 1919

=== J.W. Emmert (1887) ===
Emmert's excavations for the American Bureau of Ethnology (Smithsonian Institution) took place in 1887, and were discussed in the bureau's 12th Annual Report, published in 1894. Emmert focused on two mounds on the north end of the island, known simply as Mound 1 and Mound 2. Mound 1 was 100 feet (30 m) in diameter and 6.5 feet (2.0 m) high, and described as "thoroughly worked over." Emmert uncovered 14 skeletons in Mound 1, along with pottery fragments, flint chips, glass beads, and an iron bracelet. Mound 2 was slightly larger than Mound 1, but was flanked by a diamond-shaped terrace 570 feet (170 m) long and 8 feet (2.4 m) high, which Emmert believed to be man-made. Excavators uncovered 67 skeletons in Mound 2, as well as a burnt-clay tumulus surrounded by irregular cedar-post formations.

=== M.R. Harrington (1919) ===
In 1919, Tennessee state archaeologist Mark Harrington boated down the Tennessee River to investigate a series of mound structures scattered along the river between Lenoir City and Hiwassee Island (about 100 miles downstream from Bussell). Like Emmert, Harrington focused on the north end of the island, although he noted that the mounds Emmert excavated had been leveled. Of the 41 burials uncovered by Harrington, 9 were of the older "Round Grave" culture. He attributed the remainder to the later, historic Cherokee inhabitants. Harrington suggested that the large diamond-shaped terrace mentioned by Emmert was a massive midden deposit that had accumulated over several centuries.

Harrington described the graves of the Round Grave culture as measuring 2 to 3 feet in diameter, with the bodies folded and compacted to fit in the graves. Typical burial goods included bone awls, steatite bowls, and animal teeth. In contrast, the Cherokee graves were rectangular, with the bodies laid in a flexed position. Typical Cherokee burial items included earthenware vessels, glass beads, and pipes.
