= Citico (Cherokee town) =

Historic site near Madisonville, Tennessee

- U.S. National Register of Historic Places
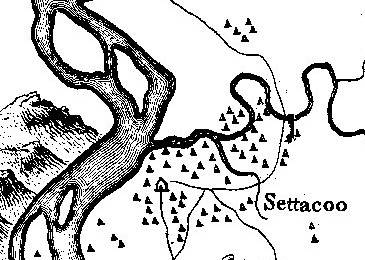
- Citico ("Settacoo") on Henry Timberlake's 1762 "Draught of the Cherokee Country"
- Location: Monroe County, Tennessee
- Nearest city: Vonore
- Coordinates: 35°32′56″N 84°5′56″W
- Built: 1000–1500 CE
- NRHP reference No.: 78002614
- Added to NRHP: 1978

Citico (also "Settaco", "Sitiku", and similar variations; Cherokee: ᏏᏘᎫ, romanized: Sitigu) is a prehistoric and historic Native American site in Monroe County, Tennessee, in the southeastern United States. The site's namesake Cherokee village was the largest of the Overhill towns, housing an estimated Indian population of 1,000 by the mid-18th century. The Mississippian village that preceded the site's Cherokee occupation is believed to have been the village of "Satapo" visited by the Juan Pardo expedition in 1567.

The Citico site is now submerged by the Tellico Lake impoundment of the Little Tennessee River, created by the completion of Tellico Dam at the mouth of the river in 1979. The modern community of Citico Beach has developed along the shoreline above the ancient site. The lake is managed by the Tennessee Valley Authority and the Tennessee Wildlife Resources Agency.

== Geography ==
Tellico Lake covers the lower 33 miles (53 km) of the Little Tennessee River, which flows down from the mountains to the south and traverses parts of Blount, Monroe, and Loudon counties before emptying into the Tennessee River near Lenoir City. The Citico site was situated along the southwest bank of the river immediately below the river's confluence with Citico Creek, which empties into the river approximately 31 miles (50 km) upstream from the river's mouth. Citico is located in an area where the Great Smoky Mountains and the Unicoi Mountains give way to the Appalachian Ridge-and-Valley Province.

Citico Beach is located along Highway 455 approximately 14 miles (23 km) south of Vonore. The Citico site is also visible from the Harrison Branch boat ramp, which is located just off U.S. Route 129 2 miles (3.2 km) south of Pumpkin Center.

== History ==
=== Satapo ===
On October 16, 1567, an expedition led by Spanish explorer Juan Pardo arrived at a village known as "Satapo" while en route to Coosa, a powerful chiefdom centered in modern northern Georgia. Research conducted by anthropologist Charles Hudson in the 1980s suggests that Satapo was situated at the Citico site in Monroe County, and that the two names are linguistically related. According to Hudson, the Pardo expedition left Olamico (on Zimmerman's Island, now submerged by Douglas Lake) on October 13 and traveled southwest across the foothills of the Great Smokies, crossing Little River at modern-day Walland and traversing Happy Valley to arrive at "Chalahume" (Chilhowee) in the Little Tennessee Valley on October 15. After the expedition made its way to Satapo the following day, a friendly native warned Pardo of a plot against him, and the expedition returned to Olamico shortly thereafter.

Hudson speculates that when the Cherokee replaced Satapo's Muskogeean-speaking Mississippian inhabitants, the Cherokee kept the site's name. However, as the Cherokee language lacks bilabial stops, the "p" sound in "Satapo" was replaced with a "k" sound, giving the site its Cherokee name.

=== The Cherokee period ===
The Cherokee believed that a cliff overlooking Citico was once home the "Tlanuwas"— two giant hawks that terrorized people in the valley until a high priest managed to rob their nest and drop their eggs in the water below, where they were devoured by the Uktena. A Cherokee village thrived at Citico when English explorers and traders began entering the Tennessee Valley in large numbers in the early 18th century. Citico's "head man" was among the 'chiefs' who met with Colonel George Chicken at Tanasi in 1725 to form an alliance against the hostile Creeks. Citico appears on George Hunter's 1730 map of the Cherokee region and is mentioned by Alexander Cuming that same year as being one of the Overhill towns headed by a "prince" (i.e., not headed by a "king," and thus not a "mother town").

Captain Henry Timberlake, who visited the Overhill towns on a peace mission (the Timberlake Expedition) in 1761–1762, reported 204 warriors at Citico, the most of any Overhill town. Cheulah, the head man of Citico, greeted Timberlake with a ceremonial dance involving 400 townspeople and presented Timberlake with a string of beads. At a pipe-smoking ceremony held afterward at the Citico townhouse, Timberlake recalled smoking so many peace pipes that he "could not stir for several hours."

=== Decline and Early European Settlement ===
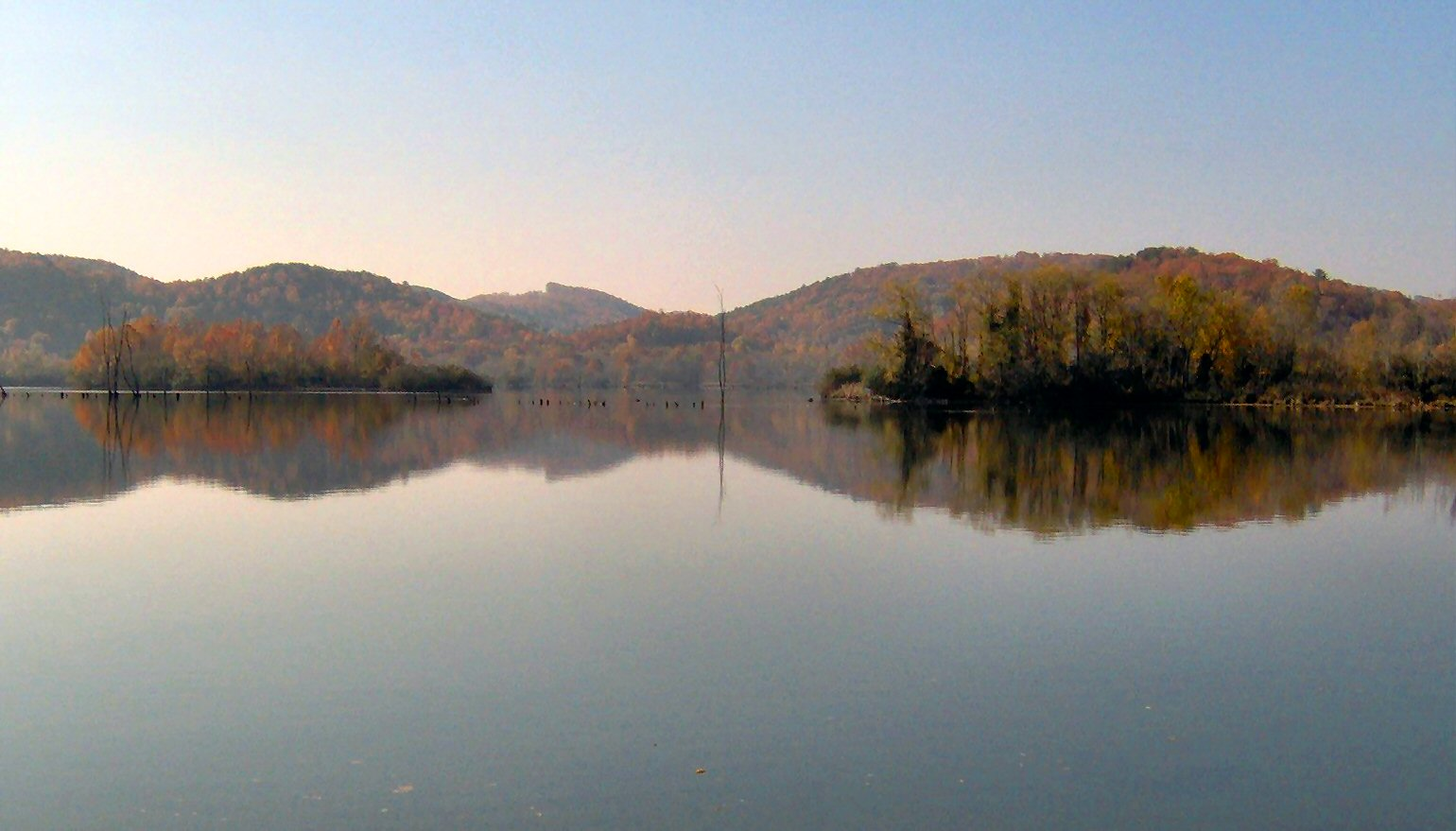
The now-submerged former site of Citico

The Overhill Cherokee consistently found themselves at odds with encroaching Euro-American settlers. After the Cherokee aligned themselves with the British in the American Revolution, the colonies dispatched forces under Colonel William Christian and General Griffith Rutherford to subdue the Overhill towns in 1776. When War Chief Dragging Canoe refused to settle for peace, Christian burned five Overhill towns, including Citico. The town burned had already been deserted because its entire population had chosen to follow Dragging Canoe's move to the southwest, where they re-established themselves at the mouth of a small creek in a town of the same name in what is now Chattanooga. Historian J. G. M. Ramsey reported a conference between militia commander John Sevier and Cherokee Chief Hanging Maw held at the original Citico in 1782 in which the two sides agreed to a truce. Ramsey goes on to relate a violent encounter two years later between Major James Hubbard and Untoola— a Cherokee "head man" known as the "Gun Rod of Citico"— that left Untoola dead and led to a warrant being issued for Hubbard's arrest.

In the late 1780s, a company of scouts led by Captain John Fain was collecting (or stealing) apples at the former site of Citico when they were ambushed by a band of Cherokees. Sixteen of Fain's men were killed, and 4 were wounded. A militia force led by Captain Nathaniel Evans arrived shortly thereafter to find several scalped and disemboweled bodies. Evans eventually linked up with Sevier's larger force, and the combined force set out in pursuit of the Cherokee responsible for the slaughter.

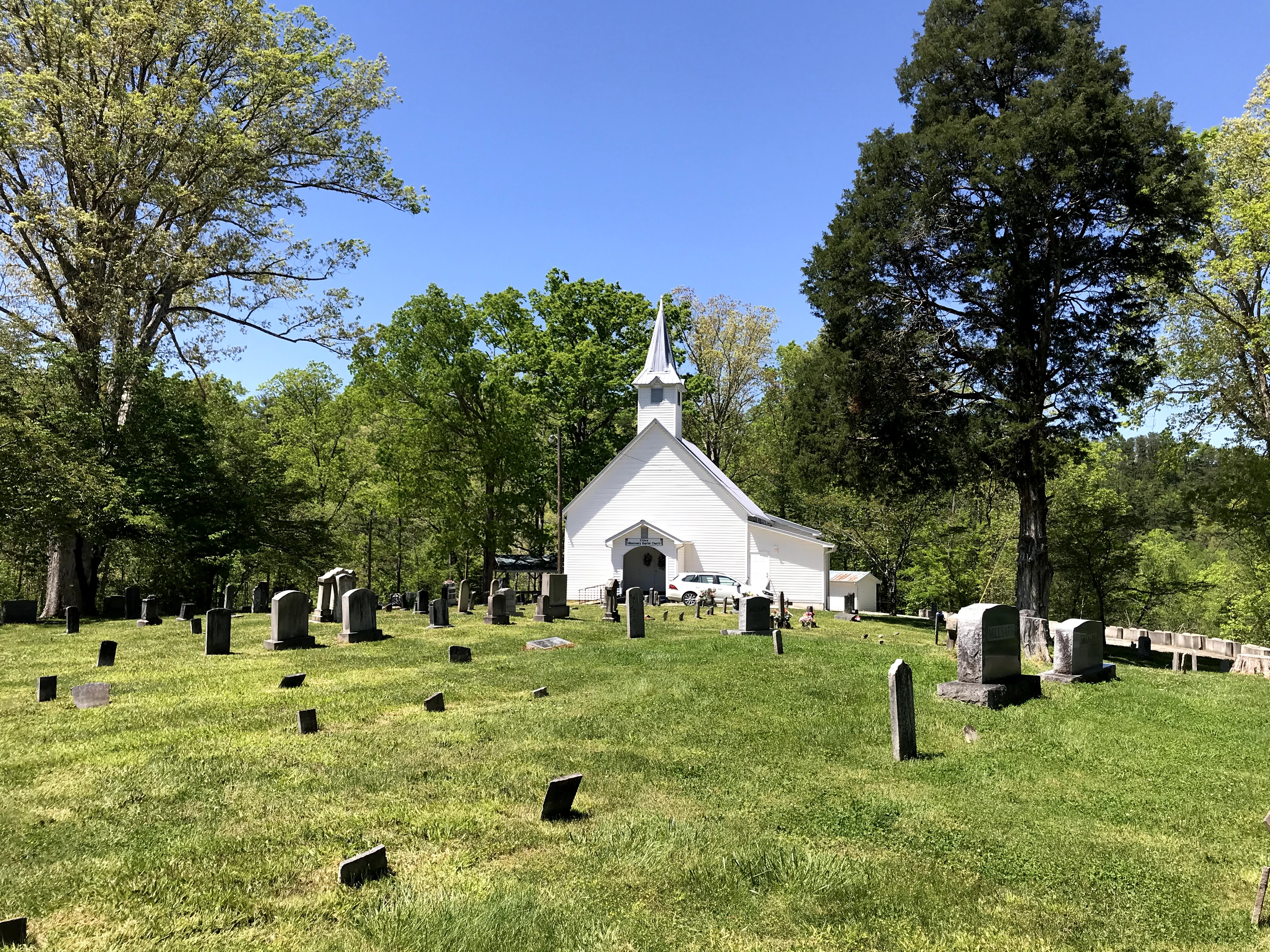
Citico Baptist Church

In the early 19th century, Scots-Irish, English, and German families increasingly began to settle along the isolated ridges and hollows of the Citico Creek Wilderness. Citico Baptist Church, founded in the 1840s by the Rev. William Clinton Millsaps, is the burial site for many of these early settlers.

== Archaeology ==
While Paleo-Indian fluted points and Archaic period (8000–1000 BCE) artifacts were uncovered at Citico and a substantial Woodland period (1000 BCE–1000 CE) site was located at nearby Harrison Branch, Citico probably did not rise to prominence until the 16th century. Around this time, Citico is believed to have superseded Toqua as the dominant Dallas phase (ca. 1300–1550 CE) Mississippian village in the Little Tennessee Valley.

In the 1880s, a mound survey conducted by the Smithsonian Institution reported eight mounds— one "temple" mound and seven smaller mounds— at the Citico site. The temple mound contained at least 91 burials. A brief excavation carried out by the Knoxville Chapter of the Tennessee Archaeological Society uncovered several Woodland, Mississippian, and Cherokee artifacts, including shell gorgets and knife blades. The chapter also reported a Cherokee burial accompanied by a musket, knife, steatite pipe, and glass beads.

In anticipation of the flooding of the site by Tellico Lake, University of Tennessee researchers conducted excavations at Citico in the late 1960s and late 1970s. Excavators uncovered the posthole patterns of 11 domestic structures, 55 burials, 119 features, and over 30,000 ceramics. The structures included two rectangular summer house/circular winter house pairings characteristic of Overhill Cherokee dwellings, a small circular structure, a square structure, and five rectangular structures. One of the rectangular structures was associated with the site's Mississippian occupation, while the other 10 structures dated to the Cherokee period. These excavations also uncovered Spanish materials, including Clarksdale bells, lending further evidence to the theory that Citico was indeed the Satapo visited by the Pardo expedition in 1567. An analysis of faunal remains from the Cherokee period showed a heavy reliance upon deer and bear for meat supplements which gradually gave way to a reliance upon domesticated animals, such as hogs and chickens, due to increased adoption of Euro-American agricultural methods.
