= Fort Early =

Coordinates: 31.8592°N 83.9288°W

Fort Early was on the Flint River, in the southwest corner of modern Crisp County, Georgia. It was named for Georgia governor Peter Early. It was, in 1814, no more than breastworks built by the Army on high ground overlooking the river, briefly occupied in preparation for a projected invasion by British forces, a threat which disappeared in 1815 with the end of the War of 1812.

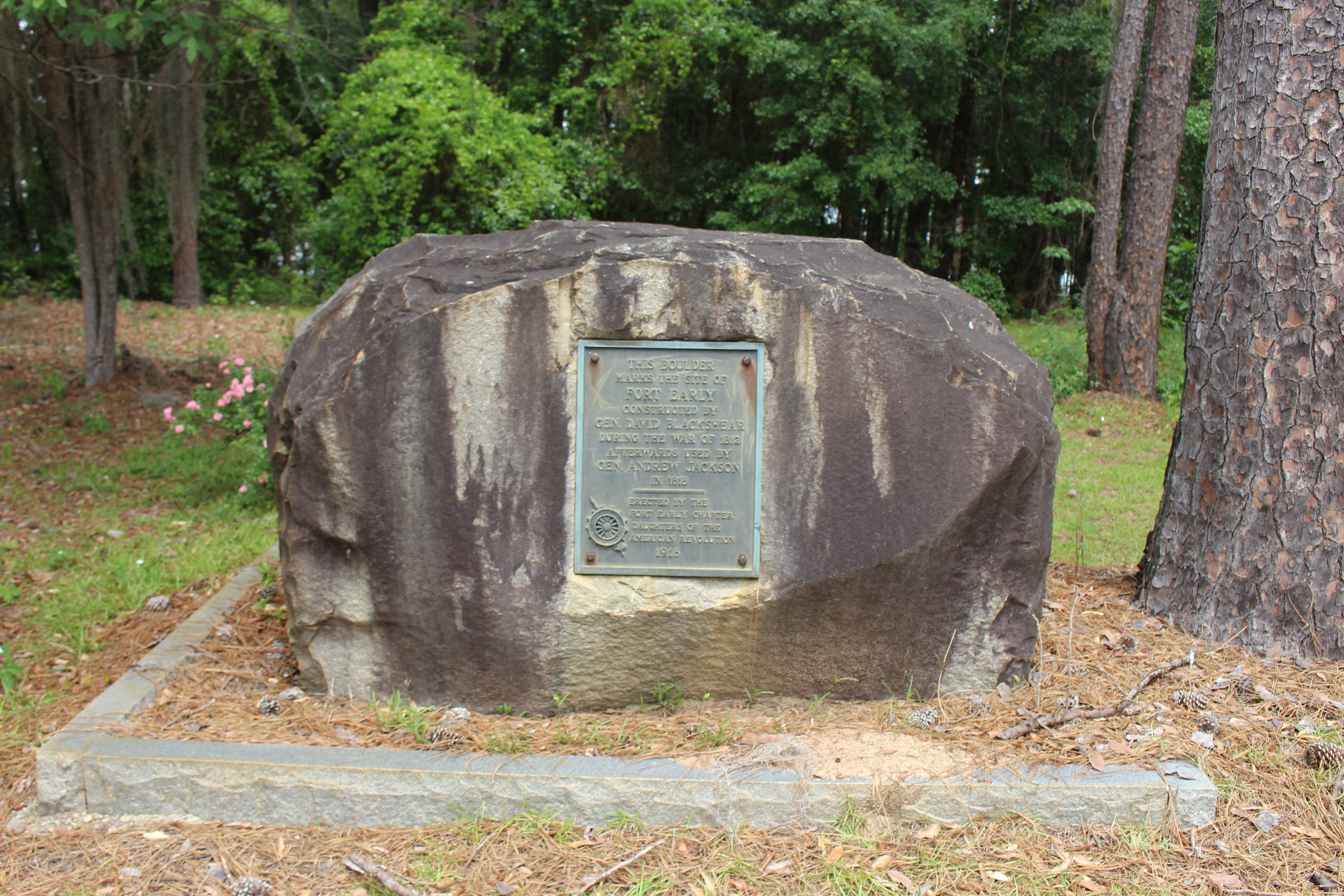
Fort Early boulder monument, Crisp County, Georgia

A log stockade was built by the Georgia militia in early 1818 and was an important supply depot and defensive point during the First Seminole War. General Andrew Jackson stopped at Fort Early in February 1818 as he marched south to relieve besieged Fort Scott.

The fort was evacuated after the war and the site reclaimed by nature. There is a monument erected in 1916 by the Daughters of the American Revolution.
