= Chiaha =

Mississippian culture chiefdom in Tennessee

Coordinates: 35.95383°N 83.49644°W

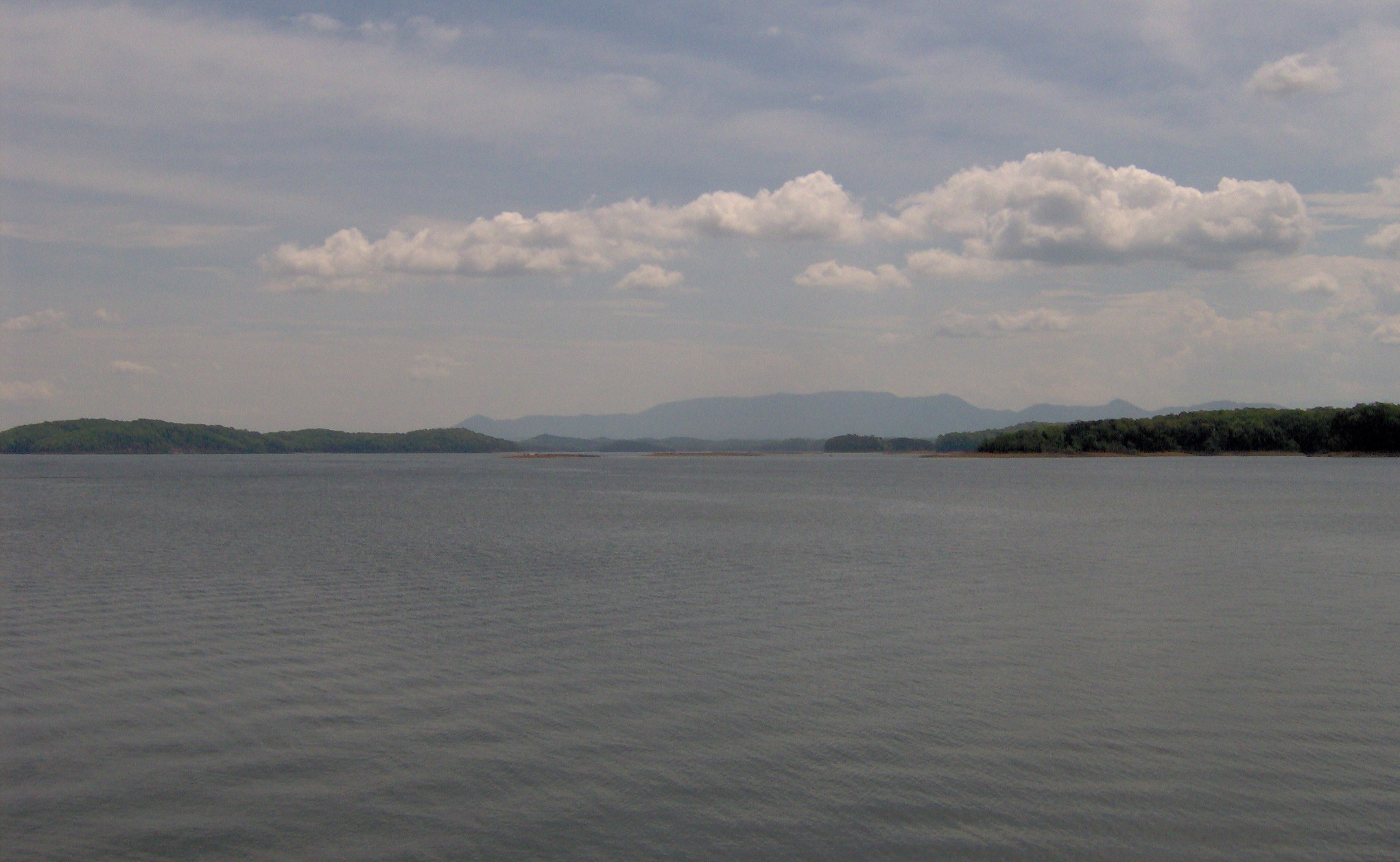
The now-submerged site of Zimmerman's Island, where ancient Chiaha was located

Chiaha (Creek: Cēyahv) was a Native American chiefdom located in the lower French Broad River valley in modern East Tennessee, in the southeastern United States. They lived in raised structures within boundaries of several stable villages. These overlooked the fields of maize, beans, squash, and tobacco, among other plants which they cultivated. Chiaha was at the northern extreme of the Coosa's sphere of influence in the 16th century when the Spanish expeditions of Hernando de Soto and Juan Pardo passed through the area. The Chiaha chiefdom included parts of modern Jefferson and Sevier counties, and may have extended westward into Knox, Blount and Monroe counties.

The Spanish explorers' accounts of Chiaha provide a rare first-hand glimpse of life in a Dallas phase Mississippian-era village. The Dallas culture, named after Dallas Island near Chattanooga, where its distinct characteristics were first observed, dominated much of East Tennessee between approximately 1300 and 1600 AD. Both the de Soto and Pardo expeditions spent several days at Chiaha's principal village.

In addition, the Pardo expedition constructed a fort nearby called San Pedro. This was one of five forts constructed in the interior west of Joara, the largest Mississippian-era site in modern North Carolina. Pardo constructed his largest fort there first, known as Fort San Juan. All but one of his soldiers were killed by the Native Americans in 1568, and the Spanish did not attempt further colonization in the interior.

The peoples suffered high mortality from infectious diseases carried by the Europeans. Historians believe this resulted in political realignments and the rise of the Cherokee and Creek tribes in these areas. By the time English explorers arrived here in the late 17th and early 18th centuries, the Chiaha area was dominated by the Cherokee.

== Geographical setting ==
The chief village of Chiaha was called Olamico in their own language. The Hernando de Soto expedition recorded the name as Chiaha and the Pardo expedition recorded it as Olamico. The town was located on an island in the lower French Broad River; in modern times it was called Zimmerman's Island.

This island was located 33 miles (53 km) upstream from the mouth of the French Broad and approximately 1 mile (1.6 km) upstream from the present location of Douglas Dam. With the completion of Douglas Dam in 1943, a reservoir was created that completely submerged Zimmerman's Island, ending possible archeological excavation of Olamico and the area.

== Spanish expeditions ==
=== Hernando de Soto, 1540 ===
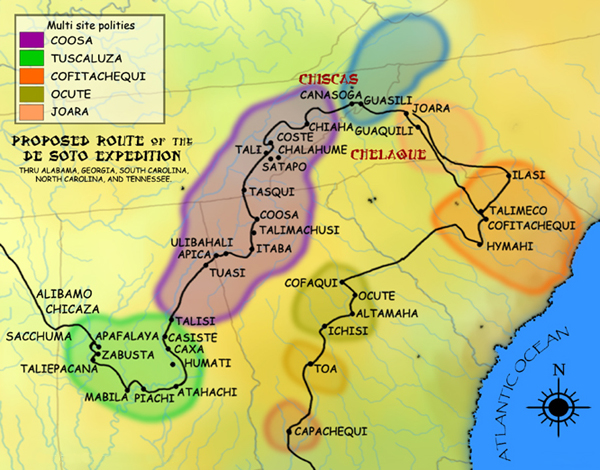
A map, based on Charles Hudson's map of 1987, showing the de Soto expedition route thru Georgia, South Carolina, North Carolina, Tennessee, and Alabama. The countries are named and shown.

In 1539, Hernando de Soto (c. 1496-1542), a Spanish conquistador, embarked on an expedition across what is now the southeastern United States in hopes of finding a passage to the Pacific Ocean and the Orient, which the Spaniards believed was much closer than across the large continent. The de Soto expedition landed in Florida in May 1539 and marched north through present-day Georgia and South Carolina. In early May 1540, they arrived at Cofitachequi (based near modern Camden, South Carolina) which dominated much of the southeastern U.S. east of the Appalachian Mountains. The expedition continued north through modern North Carolina, arriving at the village of Xuala (Joara, in modern Burke County) on May 21. It recorded the Chalaque people nearby. The expedition reached the headwaters of the Toe River on May 26. The expedition traced the Toe to its mouth along the Nolichucky River, and the expedition followed the Nolichucky into modern Greene County, Tennessee. On June 4, while camped near the confluence of Lick Creek and the Nolichucky River, the expedition was greeted by several Chiaha natives, who brought the Spaniards a ration of corn. The expedition arrived at Chiaha the following day.

Chiaha was the first town fortified with wooden palisades which the de Soto expedition encountered. The expedition's chroniclers described the village's location as "two crossbow shots" (appx. 600 yards (550 m)) from the upstream (eastern) end of the island. The island ranged between one and two crossbow shots in width. The river was wide on both sides, but could be forded. Maize was growing along the river banks opposite the island. The chief of Chiaha loaned de Soto his house, and the expedition members were initially well treated by the village's inhabitants. After approximately two weeks, however, de Soto angered the village elders when he asked them to provide thirty women for his expedition. The offended people quickly got all the women away from the village. De Soto threatened to attack the settlement, and the people fled to an impenetrable island further upstream. De Soto finally dropped his demand for women, and instead asked for porters, which Chiaha agreed to supply.

On June 28, the de Soto expedition departed westward along the French Broad River. They followed the river to its confluence with the Holston River, which creates the Tennessee River, just east of modern Knoxville and continued along the banks of the Tennessee to the village of Coste, which was located on Bussell Island at the mouth of the Little Tennessee River. The expedition followed the Little Tennessee to the village of Tali (probably a predecessor of the Cherokee village of Toqua), where they intercepted a Native American trail that led them southward to Coosa, based in modern northwestern Georgia.

While the Spanish were at Chiaha, the chief of Coste met with de Soto. He told him of mines of "yellow metal" thirty leagues to the northeast, in the territory of the Chisca tribe. De Soto sent two members of his expedition northeastward to investigate. They found only minor copper resources, rather than the gold they anticipated, and later described the terrain as very rugged. The Spaniards returned in the canoes given them by the Chisca, and rejoined the main expedition at Coste.

=== Juan Pardo, 1567 ===
In 1565 and 1566, Pedro Menéndez de Avilés, hoping to expand the Spanish colony of La Florida into what is now the southeastern United States, founded settlements at Saint Augustine in northeastern Florida and Santa Elena at Parris Island in modern South Carolina. In December 1566, De Aviles dispatched an expedition under Captain Juan Pardo into the interior with the goal of subduing the native inhabitants and mapping a route to the Spanish settlement at Zacatecas, Mexico, where they had silver mines. Pardo followed the Wateree River northward into North Carolina, eventually arriving at the village of Joara (De Soto's Xuala). Pardo built Fort San Juan at Joara and explored the area nearby before being recalled to Santa Elena. He left a 30-man garrison at Fort San Juan under the command of Sergeant Hernando Moyano de Morales.

While Pardo was away, Moyano spent several days searching for gold and gems in the Joara area (modern Burke County, North Carolina). In April 1567, he marched northward across the mountains with 15 soldiers and a contingent of natives (likely a Joaran army) and attacked and destroyed a Chisca village in the upper Nolichucky valley. After receiving a serious threat from a mountain chief, Moyano was forced to continue westward down the Nolichucky to the French Broad River, and thence to Chiaha on Zimmerman's Island. They built a small fort, San Pedro, near the fortified capital of Chiaha (known as Olamico, a Muskogean word for "chief town") and awaited Pardo's arrival.

Pardo's second expedition began on September 1, 1567, and he reached Joara in three weeks. After learning of Moyano's uneasy situation, he left Joara for Chiaha on September 29. Pardo passed through the Cherokee-speaking village of Tocae (near modern Asheville) on October 1, and then spent several days following the French Broad River across the Appalachian Mountains into modern Cocke County, Tennessee. He arrived at the village of Tanasqui (probably at the confluence of the French Broad and Pigeon River) on October 6, and reached Chiaha the following day.

Pardo remained at Chiaha for five days before departing for Coosa, described by de Soto's expedition. He spent several days traversing the foothills of the Great Smoky Mountains in modern Sevier and Blount counties before reaching the village of Chalahume in the Little Tennessee Valley. At the village of Satapo just downstream, Pardo was told that the Coosa chief was plotting to kill him, so he turned back. He again passed through Olamico on October 20 and departed back up the French Broad on October 22. He arrived back at Santa Elena in February 1568.

== The people of Chiaha ==
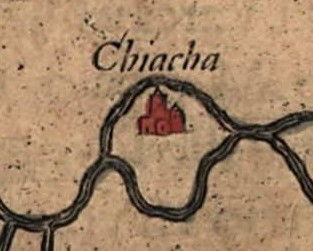
Detail of Chiaha on a 1584 map of La Florida

Chiaha was on the northern fringe of the Coosa chiefdom's sphere of influence, which stretched from Chiaha in the north to Talisi (near modern Childersburg, Alabama) to the south. While most villages visited by Pardo were headed by a low-level local chief known as an orata, three villages— Chiaha, Joara, and Guatari— were each headed by a major regional chief known as a mico (some Muskogean-speaking tribes still used the word "mico" for "chief" as late as the 19th century). Micos were apparently subject to a higher leader. At the time of De Soto's expedition, their leaders resided at Cofitachequi and Coosa, but by the time of Pardo's expedition, Cofitachequi's power had been greatly reduced. The only known leader was at Coosa, which Pardo did not visit because of a threat from its chief.

Life at Chiaha was probably characteristic of life in a Dallas-phase Mississippian period village. The Mississippian period, which began in Tennessee around 900 AD, marked the transformation of Native American tribes into complex agrarian societies. Mississippian peoples lived in or near relatively large villages whose design was centered on large, constructed plazas. These public plazas were flanked by one or more mounds used for religious and political purposes and related to the people's cosmology. The larger mounds, known as "platform mounds", were topped by public buildings. The Dallas cultures also built elaborate burial mounds.

In 1940, archaeologists surveyed Zimmerman's Island before it was inundated by reservoir waters. They photographed a 30-foot (9.1 m) Mississippian-style platform mound near the upstream end of the island (see External links). Researchers have noted that the fortifications described by the Spanish chroniclers (i.e., having square towers or bastions at various intervals) at nearby Tanasqui were consistent with the Dallas-phase fortifications excavated at the Toqua site in the 1970s. Hudson says that they were likely to have been revealed by excavation on Zimmerman's Island as well.

Like most Dallas-phase peoples, the Chiahans depended on corn for sustenance. At Chiaha, De Soto and his men were given large portions of sofkee (a gruel similar to hominy grits), honey, and a sweet-tasting sauce made from bear fat. The people also collected the wild fruits, such as mulberries and grapes, that grew in abundance in the surrounding hills. The Chiahans stored their crops in raised storehouses, which the Spaniards called barbacoas.

=== Relationship to the Cherokee ===
The relationship between the Mississippian people in the Tennessee Valley and the later Cherokee inhabitants has been a source of debate since the late 19th century. Some have argued that the Cherokee are the descendants of the Mississippian people who lived in the valleys of Southern Appalachia until the late 16th century. Based on both linguistic and archeological evidence, most scholars agree that the Cherokee, an Iroquoian-speaking people, did not arrive in the region until later, after having migrated from the Great Lakes area, where they and other Iroquoian peoples coalesced. They either conquered the Mississippian inhabitants or occupied their already-abandoned villages.

By contrast, the language of the Dallas-phase inhabitants of the upper Tennessee Valley (including the people of Chiaha) was a Muskogean language known as Koasati. It is still used today by the Koasati tribe of Louisiana.

The chroniclers of De Soto and Pardo show that Cherokee-speaking people coexisted with Mississippian Muskogean-speakers as early as the 16th century. Cherokee-speaking people lived in the mountains between Joara and Chiaha, most notably at Guasili, a village in the Nolichucky valley visited by De Soto. While Pardo was at Joara, he was visited by several Cherokee-speaking chiefs. At Chiaha, however, Pardo was not visited by any Cherokee-speaking chiefs. The fact that Chiaha and Tanasqui were the only two fortified villages noted by Pardo (other than the Chisca village destroyed by Moyano) may suggest that the people of Chiaha were at war with the Cherokee living in the mountains.

Several Mississippian town names recorded by Pardo were retained in some form by their later Cherokee inhabitants, namely Citico (Pardo's Satapo) and Chilhowee (Pardo's Chalahume) in the Little Tennessee Valley. The name of the Cherokee capital of Tanasi, also in the Little Tennessee Valley, may have been influenced by the earlier village of Tanasqui, which Pardo recorded as just east of Chiaha. The village of Jore, a Cherokee Middle Town visited by colonist Alexander Cuming in 1730, may have been named after Joara.

== Related sites and peoples ==
- List of sites and peoples visited by the Hernando de Soto Expedition
- Southeastern Ceremonial Complex
