= Coosa chiefdom =

Native American country centered at Coosa

Map of Coosa in 1540 CE along with its internal chiefdoms and neighboring states.

The Coosa Chiefdom was a powerful Muskogean-speaking Native American paramount chiefdom centered in what are now northwestern Georgia and southeastern Tennessee, in the United States. The total population of Coosa's area of influence, reaching further into present-day Tennessee and Alabama, has been estimated at 50,000. It was inhabited from at least 1400 until about 1600 CE, and dominated several smaller chiefdoms.

Hernando de Soto and his conquistadors visited Coosa on their expedition through the Southeast United States in 1539–1541, as did participants in Tristán de Luna's expedition in 1560, and Juan Pardo's 1566–1568 expedition. The Europeans recorded descriptions and impressions of the various chiefdoms they visited, describing Coosa as a series of communities and fertile gardens containing much food, rather than a town or city.

Coosa was also the name of one of the four mother towns of the Muscogee Creek confederacy.

== History ==
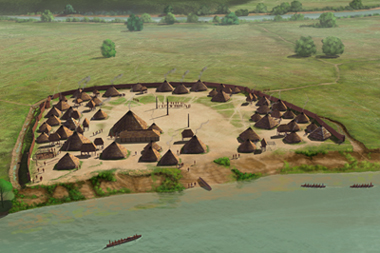
The protohistoric King site on the Coosa River, occupied during the mid to late 1500s

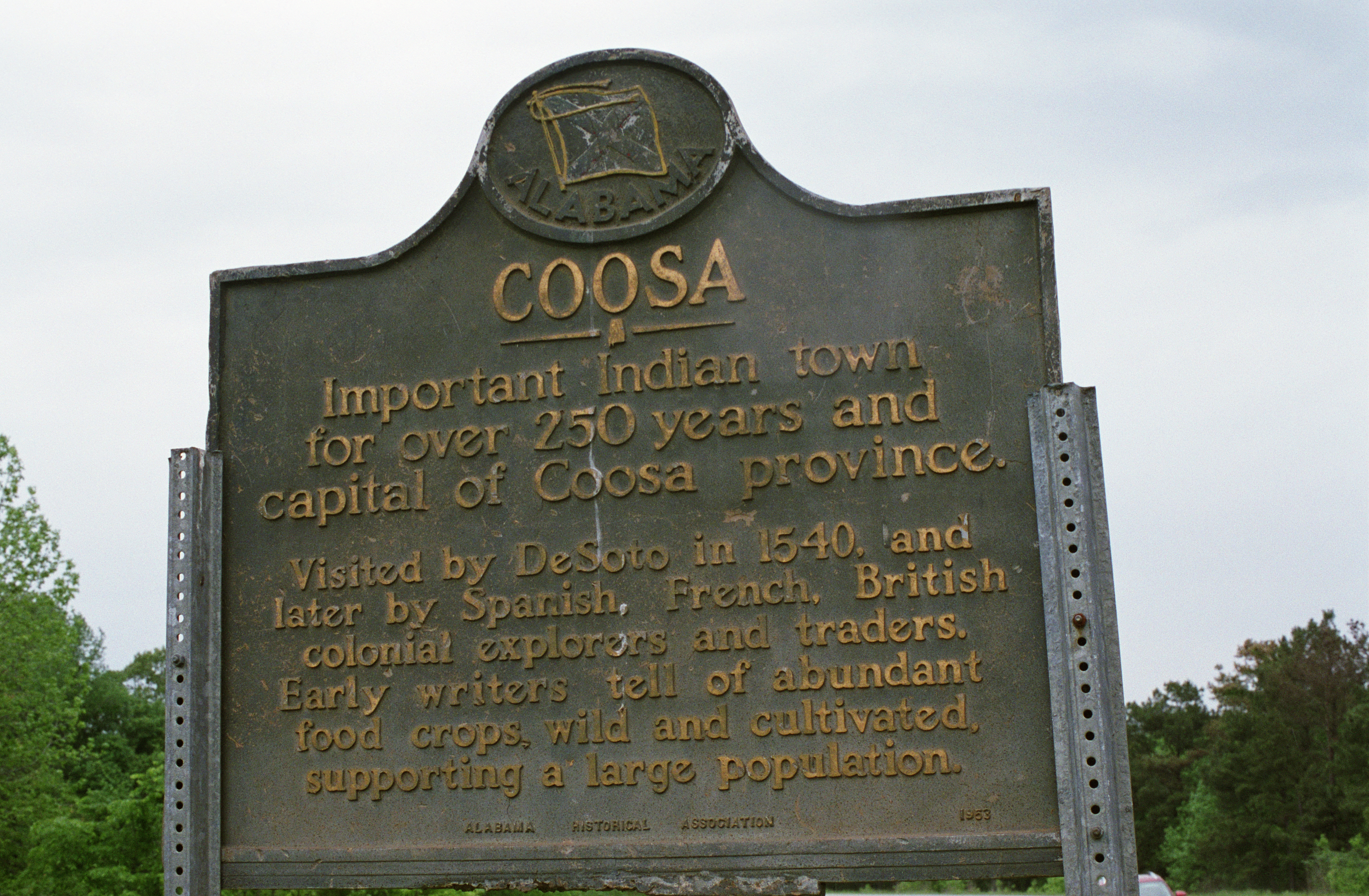
Coosa Historical Marker along Coosa River, outside Childersburg, Alabama

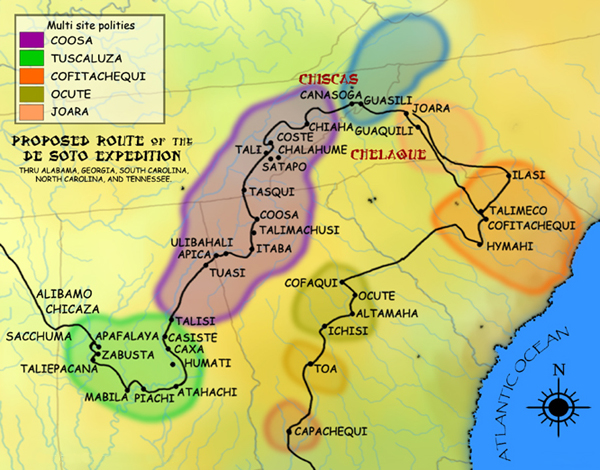
A map showing the de Soto expedition route through Georgia, South Carolina, North Carolina, Tennessee, and Alabama. Based on the Charles M. Hudson map of 1997

The Coosa chiefdom was centered at a site along the Coosawattee River in present-day Gordon and Murray counties in northwestern Georgia. The capital of Coosa, it had a large plaza and three platform mounds, as well as residential dwellings. Researchers have found various Mississippian culture pottery types, the most substantial of which reflect the site's Middle and Late South Appalachian Mississippian culture (a regional variation of the Mississippian culture) habitation from 1300 to 1600.

Archeologists, who nicknamed this settlement as "Little Egypt", have defined these as the Dallas, Lamar, and Mouse Creek phases of pottery. These type variations could indicate that the chiefdom underwent three archaeological phases and changes in culture, each with distinct pottery and artifact styles. Only one other village had a mound; the others associated with the chiefdom had only residential dwellings.

Hernando de Soto and his expedition entered the Coosa chiefdom in 1540. Chroniclers recorded that the chiefdom consisted of eight villages. Archaeologists have identified the remains of seven of these, including the capital. The population of the Coosa is thought to have been between about 2,500 to 4,650 people. The chief of Coosa ruled over a significantly wider confederation of other chiefdoms, whose territory spread 400 miles along the Appalachian Mountains across present-day northern Georgia into eastern Tennessee and central Alabama. These populations totaled in the tens of thousands. This polity consisted of seven or more smaller chiefdoms, representing about 50,000 people."

Following contact with Europeans and the associated introduction of endemic Old World diseases, the populations of the Coosa and other local chiefdoms suffered extensive fatalities from the new diseases. The societies went into precipitous decline and suffered great disruption by the loss of so much life. By the close of the 16th century, most of the core area of the Coosa was abandoned. The surviving population withdrew to a few villages along the Coosa River in Alabama. One such settlement was the King site, a small heavily fortified village of 277 to 517 people and 47 houses.

== Linguistics ==
The chroniclers of the de Soto Expedition recorded the name of the Coosa as Coça. The early French maps recorded several member towns of the Creek Confederacy as being occupied by the Cousha or Coushetta, in their transliterated form of the name as they heard it.

The Cherokee first appeared to use the word kusa to mean the Muskogee Creek people of the Upper Towns, who were competitors and enemies. According to James Mooney, they called the Muskogee Creek "Ani'-Ku'sa or Ani'-Gu'sa, from Kusa, their principal town". English speakers adopted "Coosa" as a frontier English version of the early Cherokee word. The contemporary Cherokee name for all Creek Indians is ani-kusa. This is also the name for Muskogee, Oklahoma: ᎫᏐᎢ, guso'i. The name for the Muskogee Creek people, in the revised Cherokee syllabary of ᎦᎳᎩᎾ/Elias Boudinot, is spelled ᎠᏂᎫᏌ. A singular Muskogee Creek person is ᎠᎫᏌ, "agusa," according to the Cherokee-English Dictionary (Cherokee Nation of Oklahoma: Feeling & Pulte, 1975).

The original name for the town may have derived from a Muskogean word for river-cane, such as the Choctaw word kusha (/kʊʃa/) or the Maskoki word koha (/koha/).

== See also ==
- List of sites and peoples visited by the Hernando de Soto Expedition
- Cusabo
- Mississippian culture
- Mississippian shatter zone
- Southeastern Ceremonial Complex
- Four Mothers Society
- Abihka
- Tuckabutche
- Tallapoosas
