= Sequoyah v. Tennessee Valley Authority =

1979 US District Court case

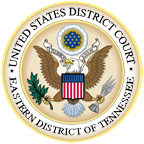
- Court: United States District Court for the Eastern District of Tennessee
- Full case name: Ammoneta SEQUOYAH, Richard Crowe, Gilliam Jackson, Individually and Representing Other Cherokees similarly situated, and the Eastern Band of Cherokee Indians, and The United Ketooah Band of Cherokee Indians v. TENNESSEE VALLEY AUTHORITY.
- Started: November 2nd, 1979
- Citation: Civ. No. 3-79-418.

Case history
- Appealed to: United States Court of Appeals for the Sixth Circuit

Court membership
- Judges sitting: Robert L. Taylor, District Judge.

Sequoyah v. Tennessee Valley Authority, 480 F.Supp. 608 (1979), was a United States District Court case that ruled on the applicability of the Free Exercise clause to the relationship and significance of land sacred to the Cherokee people, specifically the Little Tennessee River and its surrounding valley. The suit, brought by three Cherokee individuals and two Cherokee organizations/bands to the United States District Court for the Eastern District of Tennessee, sought an injunction to restrain the Tennessee Valley Authority (TVA) from flooding the sacred Cherokee land along the Little Tennessee River for the purpose of creating the Tellico Dam. The plaintiffs argued that the flooding of the Little Tennessee River valley, given their specific spiritual and historical relationship to the land, would infringe on their right to practice their religion.

== Background ==
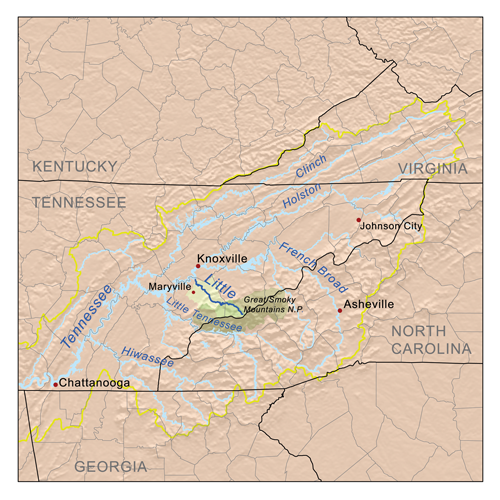
Present-day map of Little Tennessee River and surrounding regions and rivers.

Stemming from the headwaters of northeastern Georgia, the Little Tennessee River watershed flows into present-day eastern Tennessee from its southeastern source in the Appalachian Mountains of North Carolina. Approximately 80 kilometers (50 miles) of the river's 217 kilometer (135 mile) span flows through Tennessee, passing present-day Monroe County, before its confluence with the smaller Tellico River and the greater Tennessee River.

The Little Tennessee River valley is revered by geologists, archeologists, and the native Cherokee population for the vast ecosystems of its waters and shore land, as well as its historical and spiritual sites that can be dated back as early as the Archaic period (8000-1000 B.C.). The Cherokee people have historically resided across the Southeastern Woodlands of what is now known as the United States, and developed strong historical ties to the regions surrounding the Little Tennessee river. The ancient capital of Chota — regarded as the "mother town" and the epicenter of Cherokee spirituality, politics, culture, and history — is located in present-day Monroe County in the Little Tennessee River valley. The surrounding villages of Citico, Toqua, Tomotley, Mialaquo, Tuskegee, and Tanasi (whence the state of Tennessee derived its name), are home to countless sacred sites, holy places, and ancestral grave sites. The river valley is also known as a brook and rainbow trout fishing source, in addition to being a rich farming and medicine-gathering site due to thefertile earth surrounding it.

Anglo-American colonial officer Henry Timberlake's "Draught of the Cherokee Country," drawn circa 1762, identifying Cherokee villages along the Little Tennessee River, specifically denoting Chota as "The Metropolis."

=== Tellico Dam Conflict ===
Created in 1933 as part of President Franklin D. Roosevelt's New Deal, the Tennessee Valley Authority (TVA) had built more than 60 dams in its jurisdiction in the Southeastern region of the United States by 1960. That year, the TVA began drawing up plans to build a final dam in the last 51 kilometers (33 miles) of the Little Tennessee River before its confluence with the Tennessee River, north of Monroe County and Tellico Village. This project, referred to as the "Tellico Project," required 38,000 acres of surrounding land, promising to increase tourism and economic development for the proposed city of Timberlake, which was never built. Half of the land was intended for submersion, while the remaining half was intended for construction/equipment purposes and Timberlake's eventual industrial, residential, and commercial needs.

Due to the conflict between Indigenous land claims and the TVA's plans to flood the area, the district court was to rule as to whether the Free Exercise Clause of the First Amendment, which protects the right to believe and practice religion, prohibited the TVA from creating the dam and destroying sacred homeland. The court had to test whether denying people access to land they consider sacred, even if it is owned by the government, infringes on the right to freely exercise religion under the First Amendment. However, deliberations mainly concerned the viability of Cherokee religion and relationship to land as concepts that afforded protection under the First Amendment.

== Cherokee Arguments: Historical, Religious/Spiritual, Cultural Context of Sequoyah v. TVA ==
In October 1979, Amoneeta Sequoyah filed a temporary restraining order in the United States District Court for the Eastern District of Tennessee against the Tennessee Valley Authority (TVA). Sequoyah sought to restrain the TVA from any further construction on the Tellico Dam until a court could rule on the constitutionality of the dam's existence given the religious significance of the land on which it was being built. By the time the order was filed, the TVA had already excavated several sacred Cherokee artefacts and over one thousand Cherokee ancestors, which were being stored in the basement of the University of Tennessee without the consent of any Cherokee leaders or descendents. Sequoyah was shortly joined by two other Cherokee men, Richard Crowe and Gillam Jackson, as well as the Eastern Band of Cherokee Indians and the United Keetoowah Band of Cherokee Indians, representing all Cherokee people. The plaintiffs' claims held that given the sacred character, or intrinsic religious context, of the Little Tennessee River valley to the Cherokee people, flooding the valley would restrict Cherokee people in exercising their religion, as protected in the Free Exercise clause of the First Amendment.

Cherokee lifeways hold that the physical realm and spiritual are inseparable. Sites and ancient villages where Cherokee ancestors lived, gathered medicines, and were buried have extreme religious significance. The land itself, not necessarily or exclusively the human activity performed on it, is what sustains Cherokee people with a meaningful experience of religion, as stated in the plaintiffs' memorandum by the Cherokee plaintiff Richard Crowe: "It is difficult to translate to Anglo-American concepts the meaning of a sacred place to American Indians. it is not merely the symbol of something sacred or merely a place to bring forth memories of past persons or events. It is itself sacred, itself the source of sacred power." The Little Tennessee River also held specific reverence as a place to connect with the Great Spirit: "When we go to Tellico," Crowe stated, "even for a visit, the realization that this is our connection to our own ancestors and to the Great Spirit all comes back to us, and it's like going home. Each of us comes back a better person, a better Cherokee, for having gone there. If the Tellico Dam is completed all this will be lost forever."

Lloyd Sequoyah, the brother of plaintiff Amoneeta Sequoyah, stated in his affidavit that the flooding of the Little Tennessee River valley would "destroy the spiritual strength of the Cherokee people."

=== Cherokee medicine and religion: Amoneeta Sequoyah ===
At 78 years old, Amoneeta Sequoyah, a Cherokee medicine man and Little Tennessee River valley local was motivated to petition the courts for relief against the TVA and their plans to inundate the land which provided him with medicine and his community's spiritual strength. Amoneeta Sequoyah was a descendent of Sequoyah, the great Cherokee polymath, painter, silversmith, and inventor of the Cherokee syllabary, hailing from Tuskegee (in what is now known as Tennessee), one of the ancient Cherokee cities slated for submersion in the Tellico project.

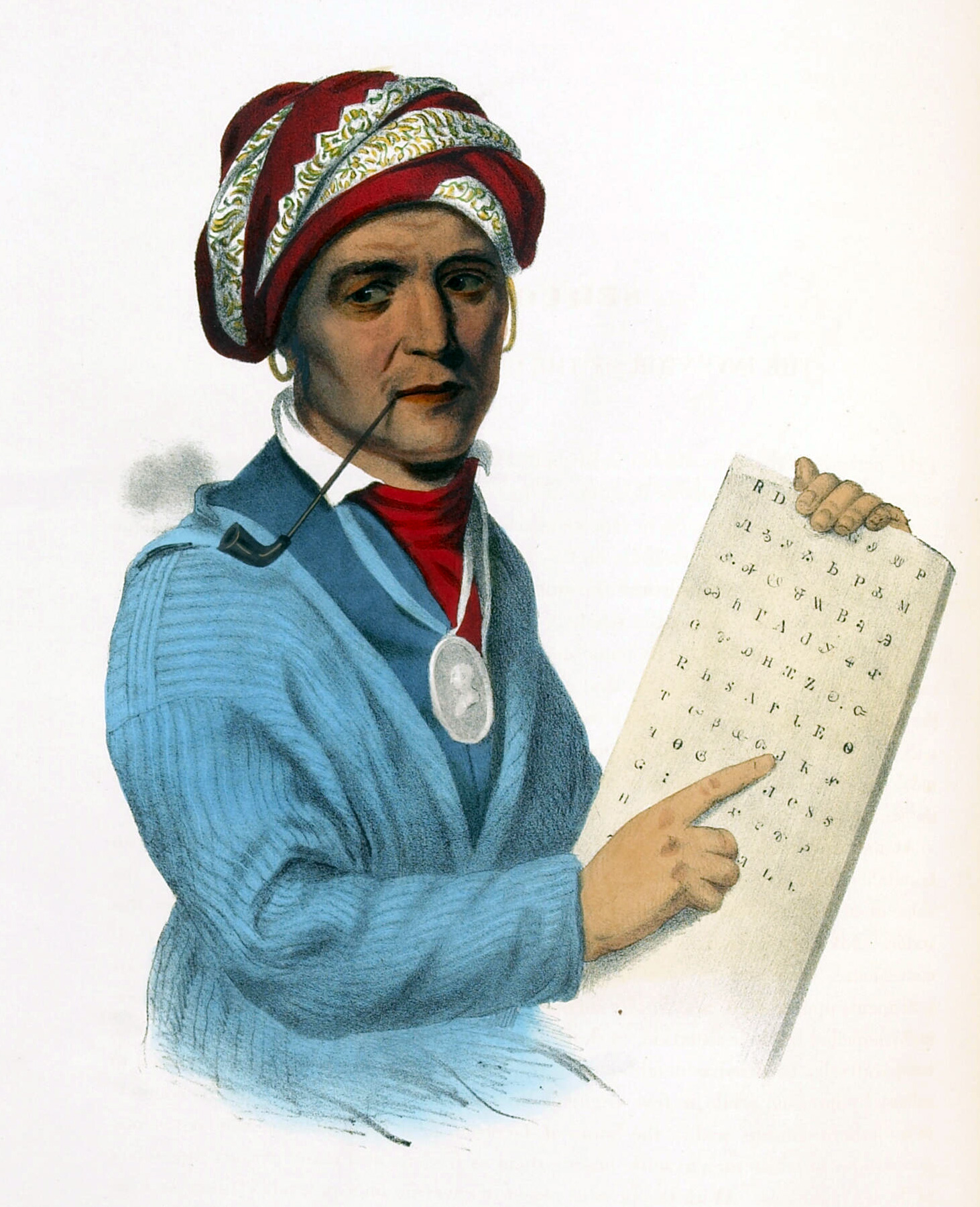
Lithograph of portrait painted by Charles Bird King in 1828, depicting Sequoyah.

Amoneeta Sequoyah's work as a medicine man was an intensely spiritual, not financial, vocation. From birth, Sequoyah was told by his parents and other Cherokee medicine men that he was going to grow up to be a medicine man, a role that Cherokee people know to be a gift to earth from the Great Spirit. In line with Cherokee custom for those prophesied to be medicine men, a feast was prepared by locals for a 5-year-old Sequoyah in preparation for the task of finding his way home after being left in the middle of the woods. In finding his way home, Sequoyah reaffirmed earlier prophecies, and his role as a medicine man and community healer began taking shape.

The work of a Cherokee medicine man requires great knowledge of and a close relationship to both the community and the land and waters from which the medicine is gathered. Sequoyah described his knowledge of local plants and their healing properties as a "creative spark" which became known to him in sleep, sustained by the knowledge from all the deceased medicine men who came before him and remain interred in the ground. As stated in Sequoyah's affidavit, Cherokee people believe that all of the knowledge that someone accumulated in their lifetime is buried with them once they die.

Three or four times a year, Sequoyah would return to the Little Tennessee River Valley to procure medicinal plants and roots to help heal the bodies, minds, and souls of members of his community, and even resided in an abandoned cabin at Chota for approximately six years. For his work as a medicine man, a process which he described as the sheer reinforcement of love between two people through medicine, Sequoyah never accepted any payment for his knowledge or labor. The work of a medicine man is to be understood as a community/religious role or duty in Cherokee communities, not as a career for the purpose of personal financial gain — though he did accept chickens as gifts in order to sustain himself.

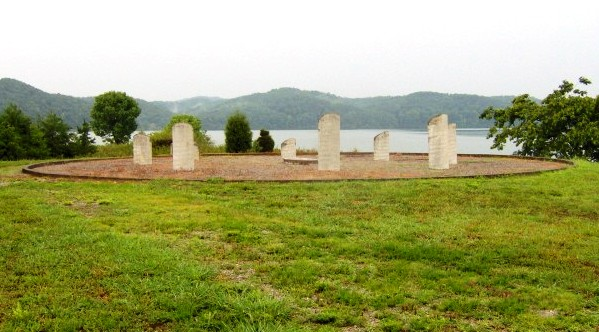
The Chota monument in Monroe County, Tennessee.

Early prophecies from the medicine men that came before him warned that Sequoyah's role would be difficult to uphold: Sequoyah was told that he may have to deal with a culture completely "alien" to him, as traditional herbal and psychic medicine was losing its place in a changing Cherokee society, and that external forces in this changing world may undermine his power. As expressed in his affidavit, Sequoyah was concerned that the impoundment of the Tellico Dam would cause irreversible damage to the Cherokee ancestors and medicine men that came before him, buried, as is custom in Cherokee culture, near the villages in which they lived, which he states would affect his ability to perform his duties as a medicine man.

In his affidavit, Sequoyah expresses that "if the water [from the impoundment of the Tellico Dam] covers Chota and the other sacred places of the Cherokee along the River, I will lose my knowledge of medicine. If the lands are flooded, the medicine that comes from Chota will be ended because the strength and spiritual power of the Cherokee will be destroyed [...] If this land is flooded and these sacred places are destroyed, the knowledge and beliefs of my people who are in the ground will be destroyed." Flooding the Little Tennessee River valley would not only destroy the source of the medicine which sustained him and his community spiritually, but would destroy the very knowledge needed to perform the religious/spiritual duty that he had been working towards since he was born.

== See also ==
- The American Indian Religious Freedom Act of 1978.
- The Religious Freedom Restoration Act of 1993.
- List of rivers of Tennessee
- Forced Cherokee Removal in United States.

=== Related cases ===
- Lyng v. Northwest Indian Cemetery Protection Association
- Wisconsin v. Yoder
- Navajo Nation v. U.S. Forest Service
- Badoni v. Higginson
- Wilson v. Block
- Frank Fools Crow et al. v. Tony Gullet et al.
