= Morganton, Tennessee =

Morganton
- Former town
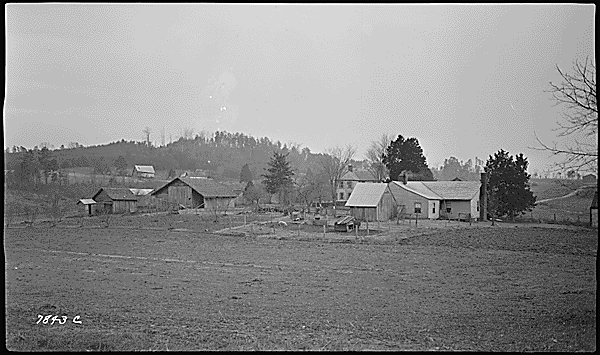
- Morganton in 1939

- Location within the state of Tennessee
- Coordinates: 35°38′36″N 84°13′38″W
- Country: United States
- State: Tennessee
- County: Loudon
- Time zone: UTC-5 (Eastern (EST))
  - Summer (DST): UTC-4 (EDT)

Morganton was a community that developed on the Little Tennessee River in Loudon County, Tennessee, in the southeastern United States. It was located 13.7 miles (22.0 km) above the mouth of the river at its confluence with Bakers Creek, flowing westward from Maryville. During its heyday in the 19th century, Morganton thrived as a flatboat port and regional business center. An important ferry operated at Morganton for nearly 170 years providing service across the river. The abandoned townsite was submerged in the late 20th century by creation of Tellico Lake, part of the Tellico Dam hydroelectric project completed in 1979 by the Tennessee Valley Authority (TVA).

Due largely to the decline in river trade that occurred in the mid-19th century following construction of railroads in East Tennessee, Morganton was mostly deserted by the late 1960s. This was when the TVA began buying up property to prepare for construction of Tellico Dam. Since the flooding of the lake area, the Morganton Cemetery, which overlooks the former townsite, is all that remains of the community. A road and Tennessee Wildlife Resources Agency boat ramp are named for Morganton.

== Geographical setting ==
The Little Tennessee River rises in the Appalachian Mountains of Georgia and meanders its way through southwestern North Carolina before entering Tennessee, where it flows for roughly 54 miles (87 km) before emptying into the Tennessee River near Lenoir City. The TVA bought properties throughout the river valley in preparation for completion of Tellico Dam at the river's mouth in 1979, which created a lake that spanned the lower 33 miles (53 km) of the river. Morganton was located 13.7 miles (22.0 km) above the mouth of the Little Tennessee at the river's confluence with Bakers Creek, which flows westward from Maryville.

The Morganton site is visible from the junction of East Coast Tellico Parkway and Morganton Road, just west of Greenback. The area is under the management of the Tennessee Valley Authority.

== History ==
Prior to any European-American settlement here, this area was part of a territory dominated for centuries by the Cherokee Nation (1794-1907).

=== Early history, 1800-1860 ===
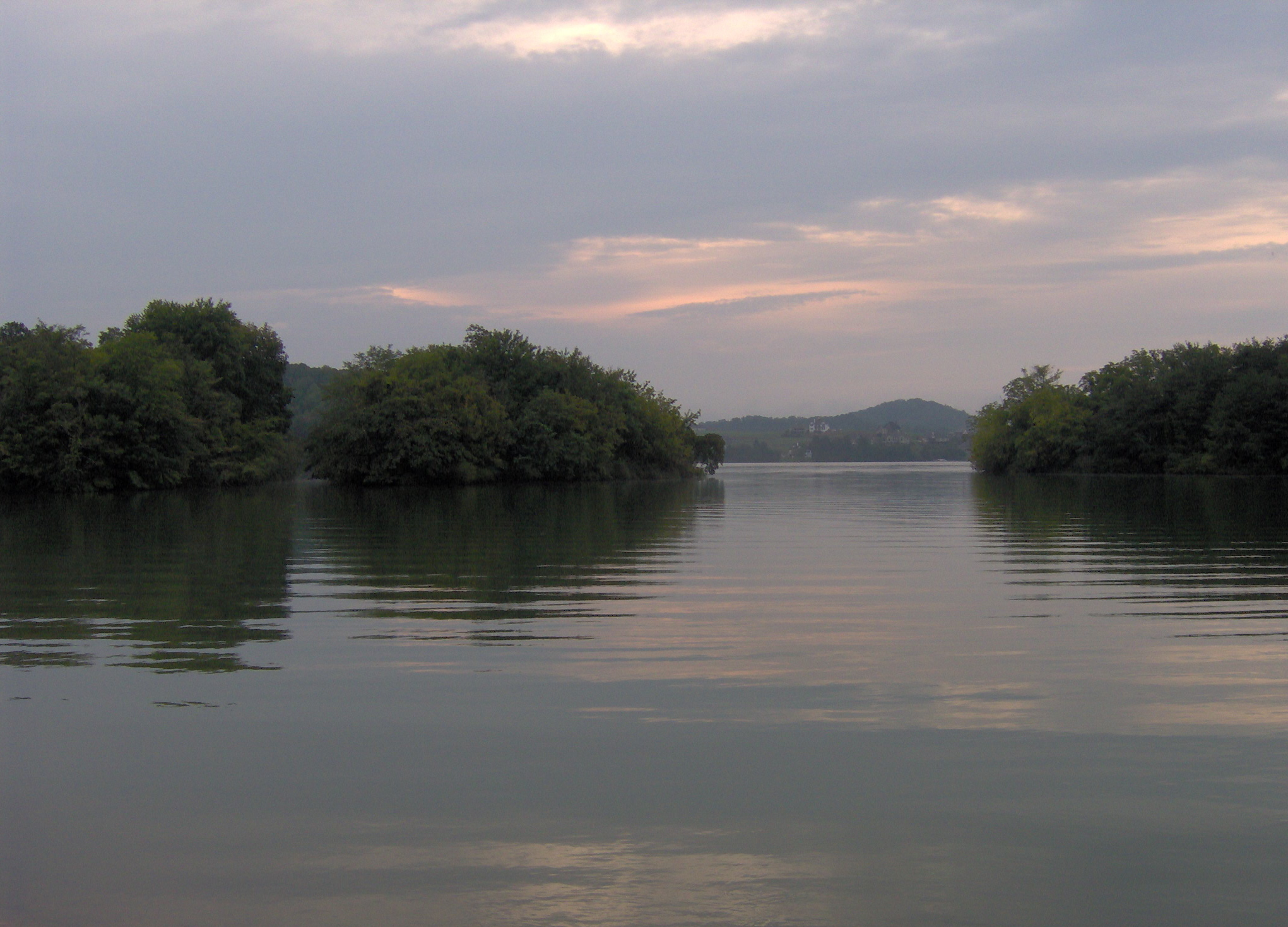
The former site of Morganton, now under Tellico Lake.

After the American Revolutionary War, there was increasing pressure by European-American settlers who started migrating into this area and squatting on Cherokee lands. The Overhill Cherokee had several major villages that were located upstream; for instance, Mialoquo was situated just around Wears Bend, on the opposite side of the Little Tennessee River. By this time, most of these villages had either been destroyed in earlier warfare or were in decline, in part due to high fatalities from smallpox epidemics.

Under pressure from the United States, The Morganton area was part of the lands ceded by the Cherokee with the signing of the First Treaty of Tellico in 1798. The first Euro-American settlers had arrived at the mouth of Bakers Creek in 1796, however, when the land was still claimed by the Cherokee. Ethnologist James Mooney recorded a Cherokee legend regarding blazed trees on the banks "opposite Morganton" that supposedly marked the location of hidden mines; he first published it in his volume on myths in 1900. This and a companion volume were republished in 1972.

By 1799 a grist mill had been established along Bakers Creek by Hugh and Charles Kelso. The following year, Captain Robert Wear (1781-1846) arrived in the area, establishing a plantation near the mouth of the river and a ferry near the mouth of Bakers Creek. In 1801, an inspection port was established near the ferry, and the small community that developed in its vicinity became known as "Portville." The community of Portville incorporated in 1813 after Hugh Kelso and his son, Charles, donated land for the formation of a town square. The community chose the name "Morganton" after Gideon Morgan (1751–1830), a Revolutionary War veteran and prominent local merchant.

By the 1830s, Morganton had grown to become the main shipping hub and business center in the Little Tennessee region. Flatboats carried local products such as whiskey and hemp to trade throughout the Tennessee Valley— and sometimes as far away as New Orleans— for products such as clothing, salt, and spices. By 1832, the town had its own doctor, hatter's shop, hemp factory, wagon factory, cabinet shop, distillery, and silversmith. A steamboat line connecting Morganton and Knoxville began operating in 1831.

=== Decline, 1861-1967 ===
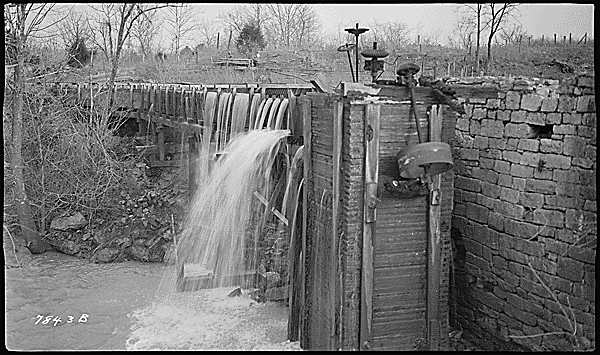
Abandoned mill along Bakers Creek in Morganton, photographed in 1939

In late 1863, at the height of the U.S. Civil War, Confederate General James Longstreet hoped to cross the Little Tennessee at Morganton en route from Chattanooga to Knoxville to dislodge the troops under the command of Ambrose Burnside, who had occupied Knoxville earlier in the year. Longstreet later recalled:

Had the means been at hand for making proper moves I should have marched for the rear of Knoxville via Morganton and Marysville ...

As Longstreet lacked the materials to construct a pontoon bridge, however, he was forced to cross the Tennessee River at Loudon, and approach from the west. That same year, however, Union General William T. Sherman crossed the Little Tennessee at Morganton en route to Chattanooga. Sherman tore down several of the town's houses to construct a pontoon bridge.

After the Civil War, railroads slowly replaced riverboats as the preferred mode of shipping and transportation. When the L&N Railroad laid tracks through nearby Greenback in the late 19th century, Morganton slowly declined. In 1947, a bridge near Niles Ferry became toll-free, putting most of the ferries along the Little Tennessee River out of business. The Morganton Ferry was the last to go, folding in 1961.

=== Archaeological survey, 1978 ===
In 1968, the Tennessee Valley Authority reported 18 houses, a store, and a church at Morganton, all of which were to be torn down in anticipation of the construction of Tellico Dam. In 1978, as the Tellico Dam project was stalled by litigation, University of Tennessee archaeologists conducted a test survey of the Morganton townsite. Several early American artifacts were located, some dating to as early as 1762, as well as several projectile points. The artifacts were similar to those uncovered at the nearby Tellico Blockhouse site, which had been excavated around the same time.
