= Icehouse Bottom =

Archeological site in East Tennessee

- Icehouse Bottom Site
- U.S. National Register of Historic Places
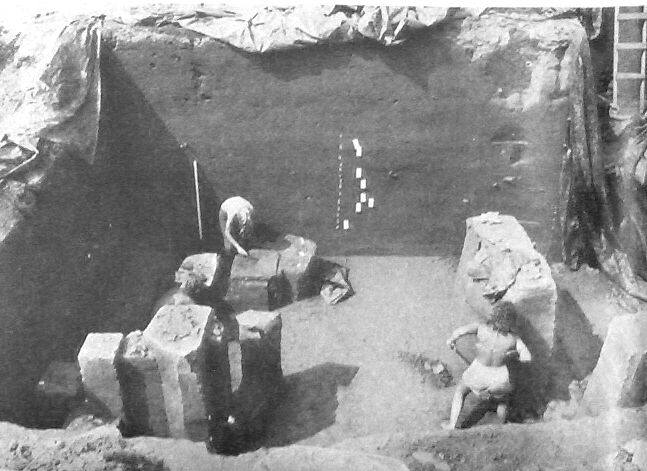
- Excavation work at the Icehouse Bottom site
- Location: Monroe County, Tennessee
- Nearest city: Vonore
- Coordinates: 35.59222°N 84.19889°W
- Built: circa 7500 BC
- NRHP reference No.: 78002615
- Added to NRHP: 1978

Icehouse Bottom is a prehistoric Native American site in Monroe County, Tennessee, located on the Little Tennessee River in the southeastern United States. Native Americans were using the site as a semi-permanent hunting camp as early as 7500 BC, making it one of the oldest-known habitation areas in Tennessee. Analysis of the site's Woodland period (1000 BC - 1000 AD) artifacts shows evidence of an extensive trade network that reached to indigenous peoples in Georgia, North Carolina, and Ohio. This was later an area of known Cherokee settlements, the people encountered by Anglo-European settlers in the 18th and 19th centuries.

Since 1979, the Icehouse Bottom site has been submerged by Tellico Lake, an impoundment of the Little Tennessee River created by the construction of Tellico Dam. Excavations were conducted at the site in the early 1970s prior to dam construction, in anticipation of inundation. Tellico Lake was developed by and is managed by the Tennessee Valley Authority, and the shoreline immediately above the Icehouse Bottom site is part of the McGhee-Carson Unit of the Tellico Lake Wildlife Management Area, which is managed by the Tennessee Wildlife Resources Agency.

== Geography ==
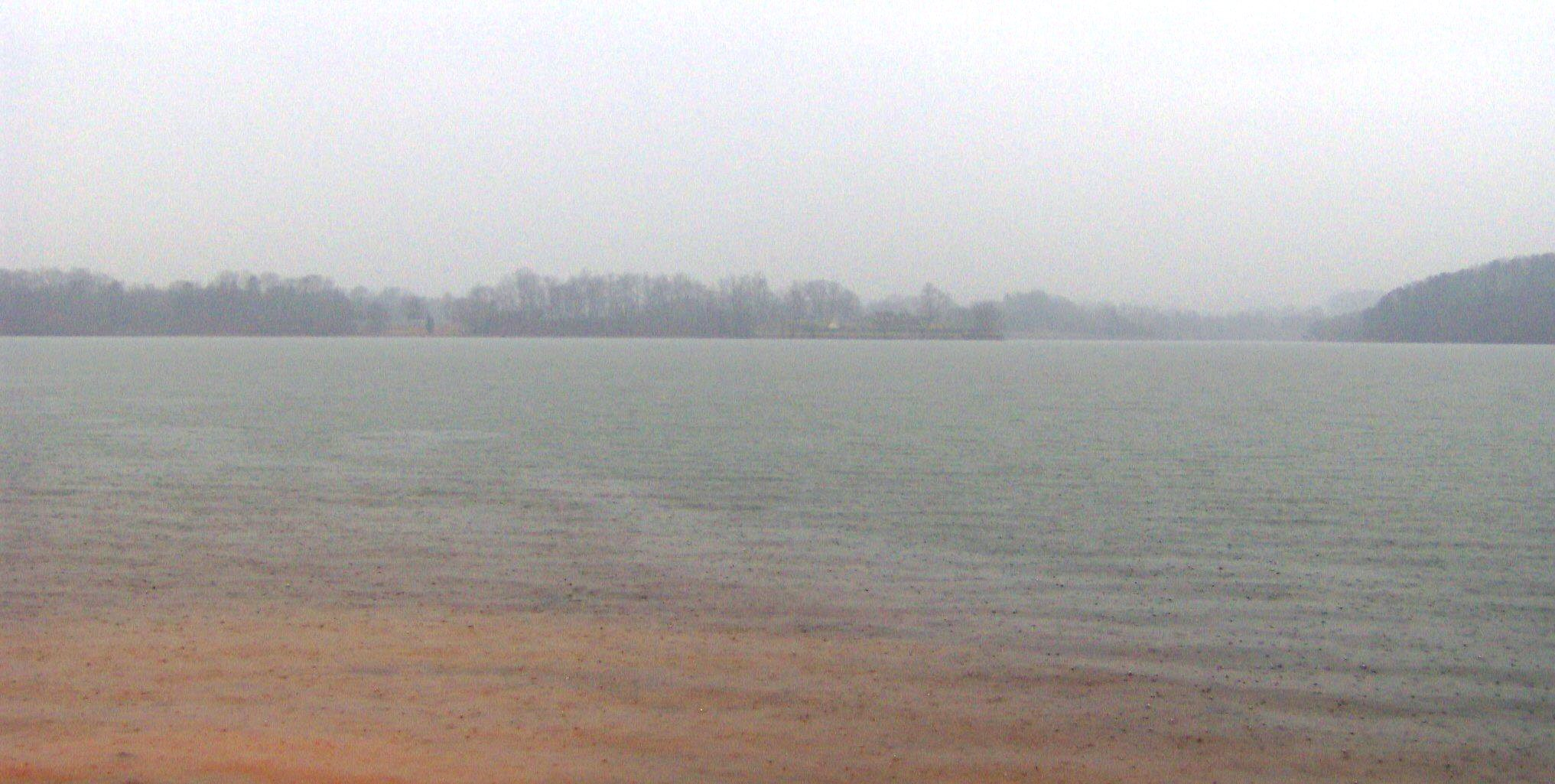
The now-submerged Icehouse Bottom site

The Little Tennessee River enters Monroe County from the east, through a water gap between the Great Smoky Mountains and the Unicoi Mountains. It winds westward for some 40 miles (64 km) before emptying into the Tennessee River near Lenoir City. Tellico Lake, created in 1979, covers the lower 33 miles (53 km) of the Little Tennessee and the lower 22 miles (35 km) of the Tellico River.

Icehouse Bottom is an archeological site of ancient human occupation that was located along the south bank of the Little Tennessee. Prior to construction of the dam and creation of Tellico Lake, this site was approximately 21 miles (34 km) above the mouth of the river at its confluence with the Tennessee River, and nearly 2 miles (3.2 km) above the river's confluence with the Tellico River. The site was located immediately downstream from the base of a steep hill known as Rockcrusher Bluff.

The McGhee-Carson Unit of the Tellico Lake Wildlife Management Area includes what was once the top of Rockcrusher Bluff. When Tellico Lake was filled and flooded the area, the bluff became a peninsula. The entrance to McGhee-Carson is located along Tennessee State Route 360 (Citico Road), a few miles south of the road's junction with U.S. Route 411. Carson Road traverses the unit, ending abruptly at the lakeshore above what was once Icehouse Bottom.

== History ==
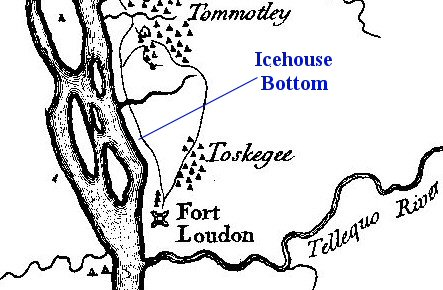
Modern indication of Icehouse Bottom using part of Henry Timberlake's 1765 map of the valley

Although little historical information regarding Icehouse Bottom is available, numerous historical areas later developed within a two-mile (3-km) radius. Fort Loudoun, a frontier fort built in 1756, was located about one mile to the north, and the Tellico Blockhouse, a federal trading outpost built in 1794, was located slightly more than a mile to the northeast. The Overhill Cherokee villages of Tomotley and Toqua were located opposite Rockcrusher Bluff to the south. The Overhill village of Tuskegee, which is best known as the birthplace of the Cherokee scholar Sequoyah, was located northwest of the Icehouse Bottom site.

In 1819, the Cherokee sold the Overhill territory south of the Little Tennessee River, which included all of what is now Monroe County, to the United States government. Shortly thereafter, an early settler known as "Pioneer" John McGhee purchased several thousand acres along the Little Tennessee River, including the Icehouse Bottom site. He developed some plantations in the area. By the early 20th century the Icehouse Bottom site was within the boundaries of a tobacco farm owned by John Carson. Carson's family owned the land when the Tennessee Valley Authority began buying property along the river for the creation of the Tellico Reservoir.

Although it is unclear how Icehouse Bottom got its name, historian Carson Brewer wrote of a McGhee family story that recalled an "ice-house" located in the 19th century on their lands in the Little Tennessee Valley. According to Brewer, a hole about 30 feet (9.1 m) in circumference would be dug in winter, and ice would be cut from the river or a frozen stream, placed in the hole, and covered with sand. This preserved the ice through the following summer.

== Archaeology ==
In 1967, the Tennessee Valley Authority began construction on Tellico Dam at the mouth of the Little Tennessee; it purchased some 22,000 acres (89 km^{2}) along the river's shoreline. That same year, the University of Tennessee Department of Anthropology, under contract with the National Park Service, began a survey of the valley to determine its archaeological resources and to select sites for excavation prior to inundation. Although project members initially were given two years before the dam was expected to become operational, litigation over environmental concerns pushed the dam's operational date to 1979.

This allowed for much more extensive archaeological work at the Little Tennessee Valley sites, which was important when their great age became known. Excavations were carried out at Icehouse Bottom in 1969, 1970, 1971, and 1977. The site's location in the river's flood plain meant that each heavy rain had added a fresh layer of earth to the site, making it easy to stratify.

=== Archaic period inhabitants ===
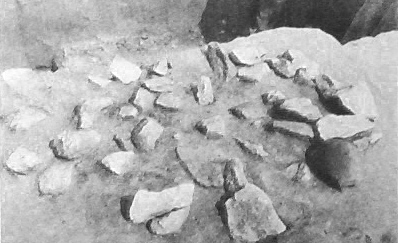
Burnt rocks from an Archaic period hearth at Icehouse Bottom

The 1969-71 excavations uncovered the charred remains of numerous clay hearths situated along the river. Radiocarbon dating has established the date of the earliest of these hearths at around 7500 BC, during the Early Archaic period (8000-6000 BC). This is one of the oldest-known semi-permanent habitation sites within the boundaries of present-day Tennessee. Some of these hearths still displayed impressions made by netting or basketry resting on the clay while it was still moist. Other Archaic-period artifacts uncovered at Icehouse Bottom include a unique type of Early Archaic bifurcate projectile point and Late Archaic (3000-1000 BC) netsinkers.

Throughout the Archaic period, Icehouse Bottom was likely used as a "base camp" and occupied by indigenous peoples on a seasonal or other semi-permanent basis. The camp consisted of several dozen dwellings that were built along several hundred feet along the river terrace. Rockcrusher Bluff contains various outcroppings of chert, which would have been sought for use in making tools and weapons. The early inhabitants of Icehouse Bottom had a diet primarily of white-tailed deer, black bear, acorns, and hickory nuts. They also hunted and ate smaller animals, including squirrel and rabbit.

=== Woodland period inhabitants ===
The Woodland-period (1000 BC-1000 AD) material recovered is notable primarily for the presence of maize, an important crop cultivated by indigenous peoples, that dates to as early as 100 AD. Because maize could be grown and stored, it supported increases in population density and the development of centers with a variety of skilled artisans. The Woodland period materials also include non-local pottery sherds, attesting to the people being part of a large trading network. Pottery fragments show that the site's inhabitants were interacting with people of other Middle Woodland sites around the region, including the Hopewell people of the Ohio valley. Woodland-period human burials and cremations have frequently been found in the Icehouse Bottom vicinity.

Icehouse Bottom may have been a manufacturing center of sorts during the Middle Woodland period. Sherds confirm a trade network that included not only the Hopewell centers, but also the Sylva and Garden Creek areas of North Carolina, the McMahan Indian Mounds a few miles to the east in what is now Sevierville, and sites as far away as Georgia. Several sherds uncovered at the Hopewell site in Ohio were probably manufactured at Icehouse Bottom. Icehouse Bottom may have also served as a regional distribution center for mica. The site appeared to have declined in use after the Middle Woodland period, although a few fragments indicative of the early Mississippian period have been found.
