= Tellico Dam =

Dam in Tennessee, United States

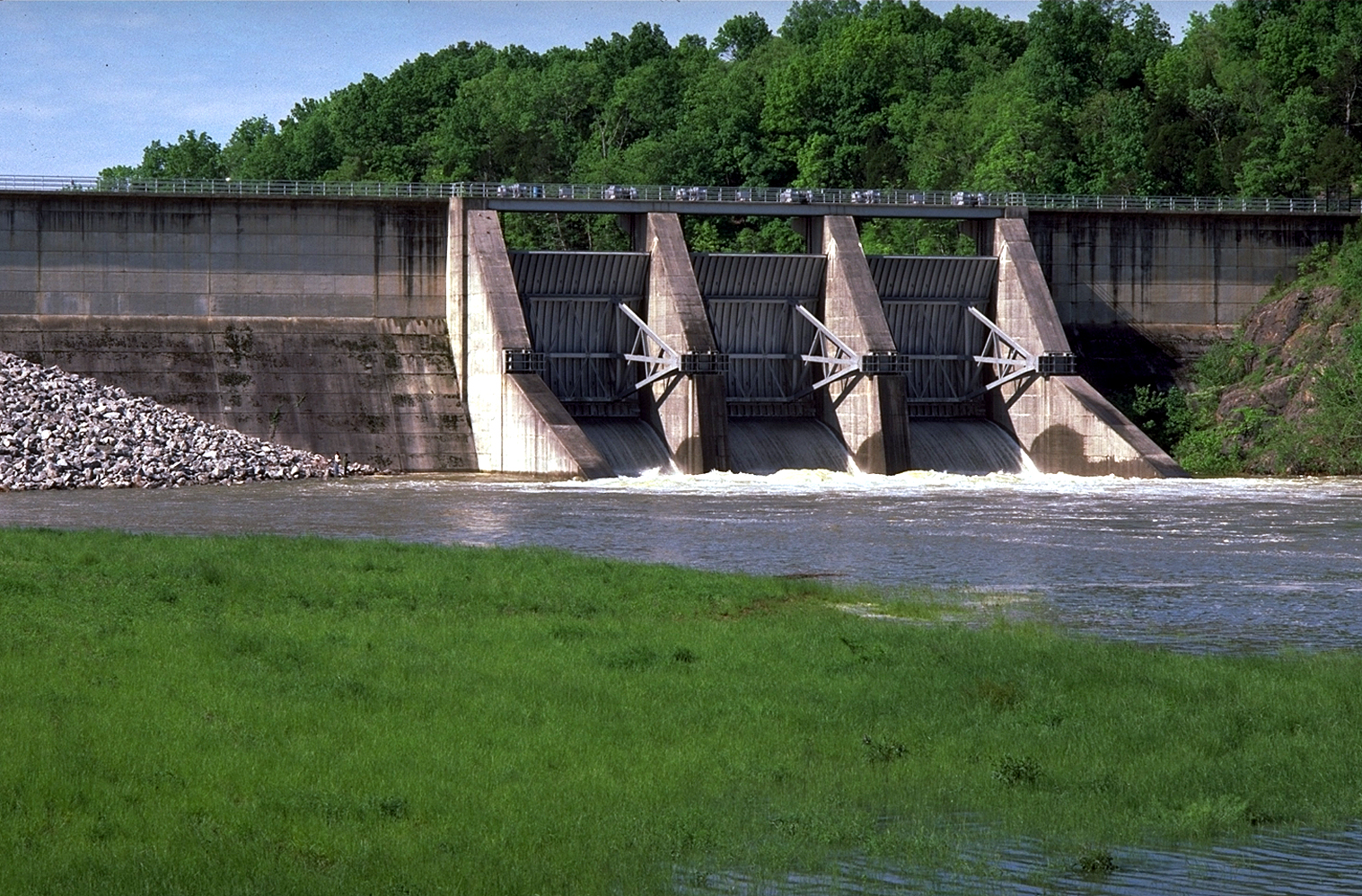
- The main concrete gravity structure for Tellico Dam (2013)
- Interactive map of Tellico Dam
- Official name: Tellico Dam
- Country: United States
- Location: Loudon County, Tennessee, U.S. near Lenoir City
- Coordinates: 35°46′40″N 84°15′35″W
- Purpose: Recreational development; economic development; tourism
- Construction began: March 7, 1967; 59 years ago
- Opening date: November 29, 1979; 46 years ago
- Construction cost: $116 million (515 million in 2025 dollars)

Dam and spillways
- Type of dam: Concrete gravity dam and earth embankment dam
- Impounds: Little Tennessee River
- Height: 129 ft (39 m)
- Length: 3,238 ft (987 m)

Reservoir
- Creates: Tellico Reservoir
- Total capacity: 467,600 acre⋅ft (576,800,000 m^{3})
- Catchment area: 2,627 mi^{2} (6,800 km^{2})
- Surface area: 14,200 acres (5,700 ha)
- Normal elevation: 810 ft (247 m)

Tellico Dam is a concrete gravity and earthen embankment dam on the Little Tennessee River that was built by the Tennessee Valley Authority (TVA) in Loudon County, Tennessee. Planning for a dam structure on the Little Tennessee was reported as early as 1936 but was deferred for development until 1942. Completed in 1979, the dam created the Tellico Reservoir and is the last dam to be built by the Tennessee Valley Authority.

Unlike the agency's previous dams built for hydroelectric power and flood control, the Tellico Dam was primarily constructed as an economic development and tourism initiative through the planned city concept of Timberlake, Tennessee. The development project aimed to support a population of 42,000 in a rural region in poor economic conditions.

The dam has been criticized as a wasteful pork barrel project, a transfer of wealth from local farmers and homeowners to developers, and bad for the environment and wildlife. Inundation of the Little Tennessee required the acquisition of thousands of acres, predominantly multi-generational farmland and historic sites such as the Fort Loudoun settlement and several Cherokee tribal villages, including Tanasi, Tennessee's namesake. Most of the acreage around the final lakeshore, originally seized through eminent domain, was sold to private developers to create retirement-oriented golf resort communities such as Tellico Village and Rarity Bay.

Because the Tellico Dam project was believed to threaten the endangered snail darter fish species, environmentalist groups sued the TVA to halt the project. In 1978, the Supreme Court of the United States, in Tennessee Valley Authority v. Hill, ruled in favor of the environmental groups and declared that the completion of Tellico Dam was illegal. Ultimately, the legal action only delayed the dam's completion by two years. A clause in the fiscal 1980 federal public works appropriations bill declared the project exempt from the Endangered Species Act, and in November 1979, the dam was completed and the reservoir began to fill.

== Background ==
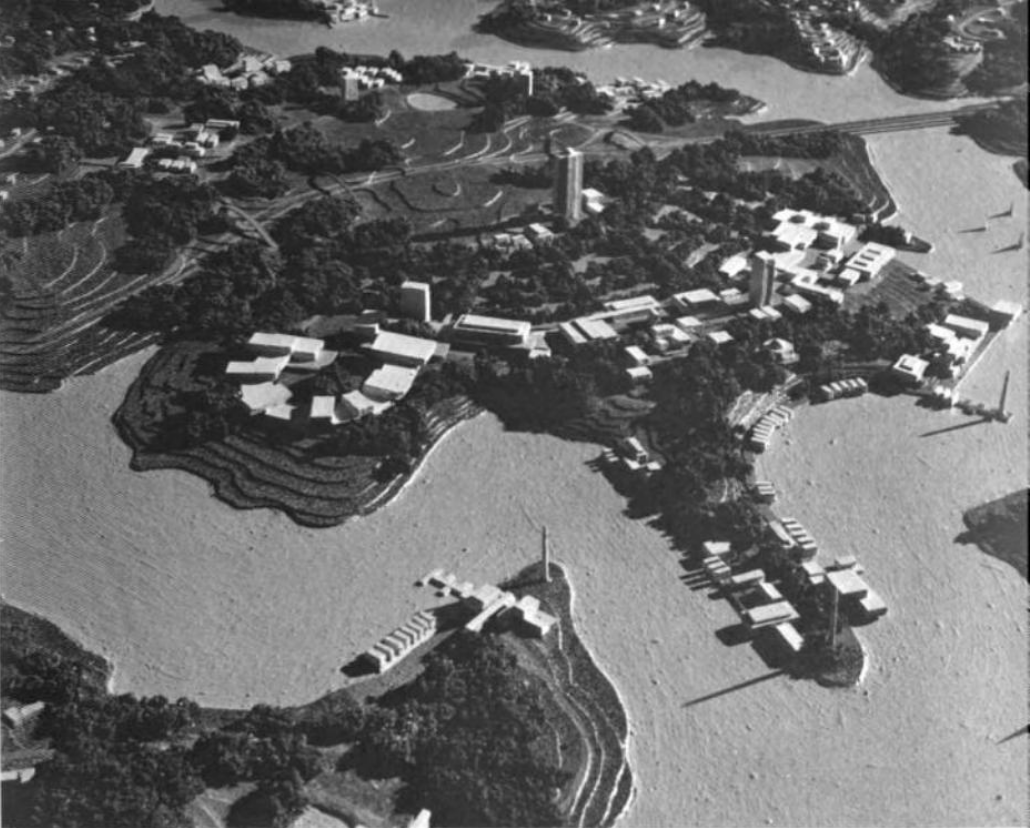
Conceptual model of the planned City of Timberlake, part of the justification for Tellico Dam

=== Preliminary planning and Timberlake initiative ===
The Tennessee Valley Authority (TVA) is a federally owned electric utility company created by U.S. Code Title 16, Chapter 12A, the Tennessee Valley Authority Act of 1933, part of the New Deal. Its shares are owned by the federal government, but TVA operates like a private corporation and receives no taxpayer funding.

The agency was initially tasked with modernizing the Tennessee Valley region, using experts in economic development, engineering, planning, and agriculture. In fact, the TVA focused primarily on electricity generation, flood control, and combatting human and economic problems.

In 1936, TVA began studies for hydroelectric dam sites as part of its Unified Development of the Tennessee River (UDTR) plan. Early TVA plans suggested the construction of a dam along the Little Tennessee River at its mouth at the Tennessee River next to Bussell Island. This became known as the Fort Loudoun Extension, an expansion of the nearby Fort Loudoun Dam. The project was canceled on October 20, 1942, because of financial constraints imposed by U.S. involvement in World War II.

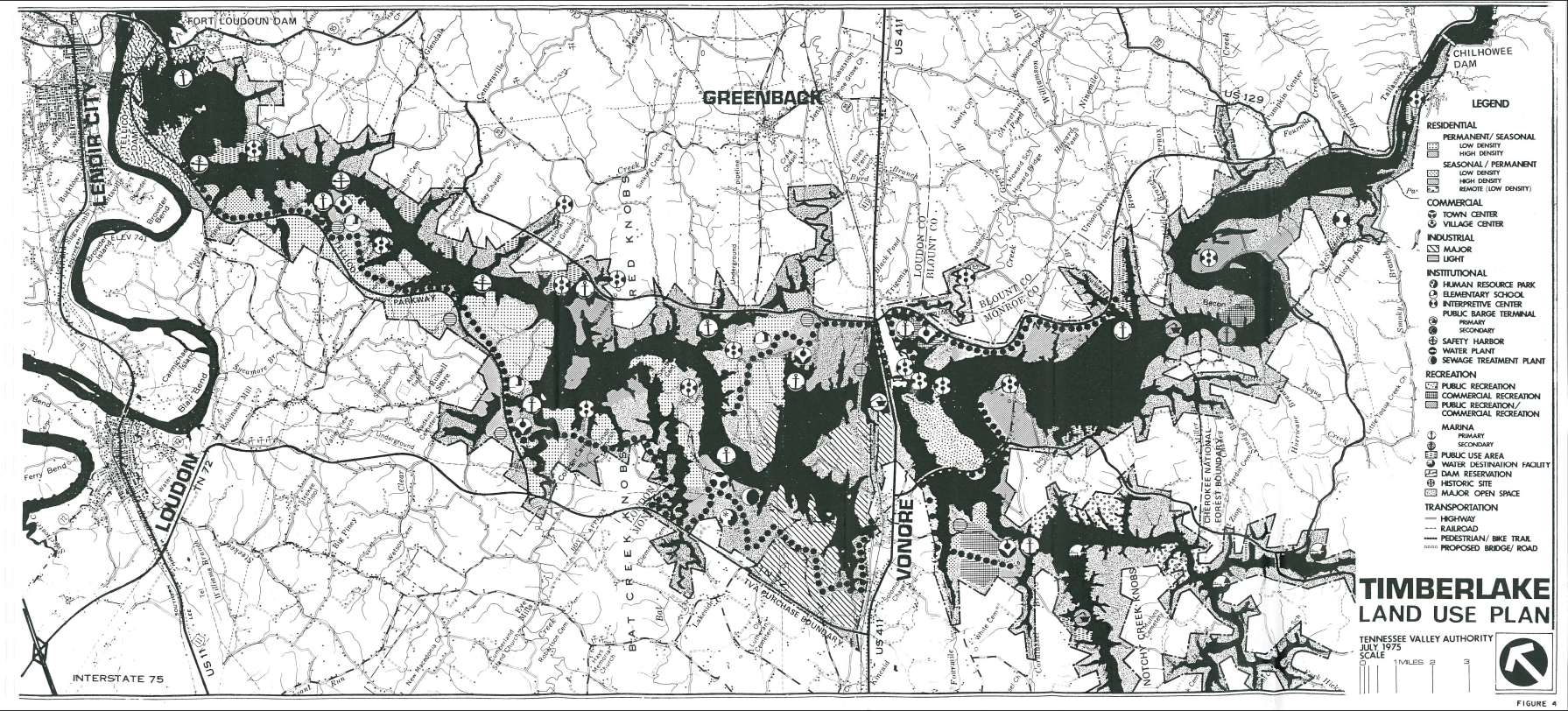
Original 1975 land-use plan for the City of Timberlake project

In 1959, the TVA reapproved development of the Fort Loudoun Extension, now called the Tellico Project. The justification for the project was to improve the economic conditions of the Little Tennessee watershed, through land and recreational development. This project, which encompassed acreage in Loudon, Blount, and Monroe counties, became known as the City of Timberlake Plan, named for journalist Henry Timberlake, who explored the Cherokee villages that once occupied the area. Timberlake, the TVA's ambitious attempt at creating a city from scratch, had a projected population of 42,000. The project was promoted as a demonstration of economic development for the rural poor, transforming the Little Tennessee Valley into a thriving urban center. The Tellico Dam would provide a large reservoir for recreation and for freight transport to proposed industrial sites with access to the Tennessee River through a canal. The dam would not produce electricity, but the canal would enable an additional 23 MW of power generation at the Fort Loudoun Dam by diverting flow from the Little Tennessee River. The Timberlake project was initially supported with congressional aid and investment from the American aerospace manufacturing company, the Boeing Corporation. In 1974, the Tennessee state legislature unsuccessfully proposed a bill seeking to incorporate the Timberlake area into a city. Boeing determined that the project was not economically feasible and withdrew in 1975; the plans never fully materialized.

=== Property acquisition and eminent domain ===
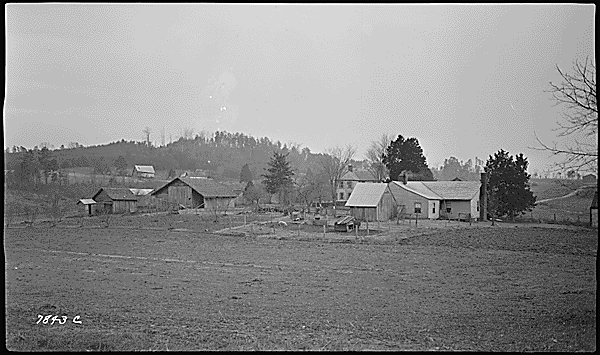
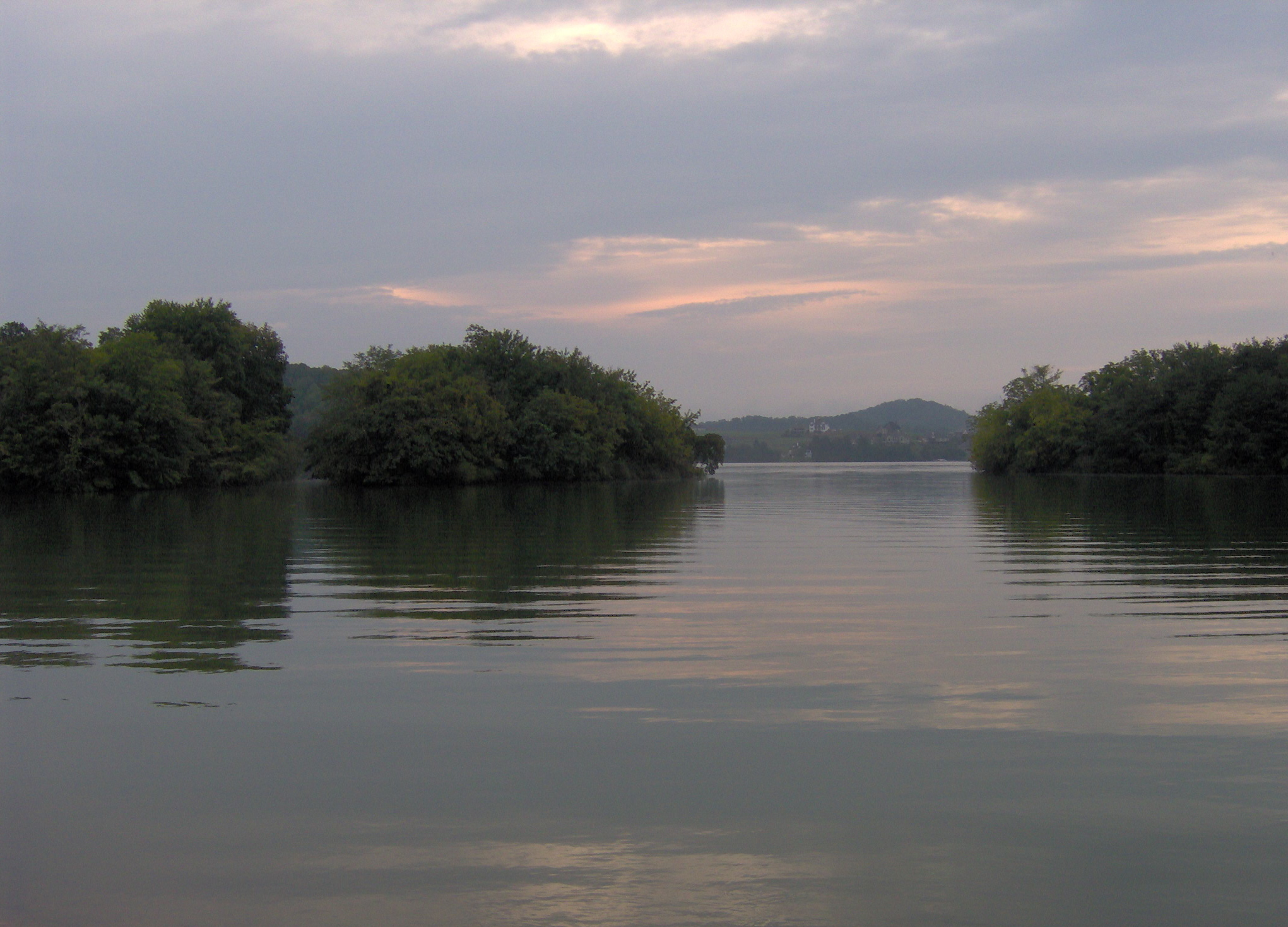
The town of Morganton was one of several communities seized and inundated by the TVA for the Tellico Project.

The Tellico Dam project required the acquisition of nearly 38,000 acres (15,000 ha) of property for its development. The reservoir created by the dam was forecast to extend over 16,500 acres (6,700 ha) with an extra 2,900 acres (1,200 ha) in flood control reserves. For the remaining area, TVA allocated 16,500 acres (6,700 ha) for residential, recreational, and industrial development as part of the proposed Timberlake planned city project. The remaining land served as buffer zones between development areas and the reservoir. When the TVA began to approach property owners in the Lower Tennessee Valley for the development of Tellico Dam, several communities that TVA sought to "modernize" through this project were at the time in touch with most of the modern Appalachian society that TVA had contributed to since the 1930s. Members of the river shed communities least impacted by modernization reacted most positively to TVA's plans, compared with the more modern communities. Historians of the project have suggested that most TVA personnel did not understand the complexity of the communities that they were intruding into with the Tellico project, leading to more heated opposition.

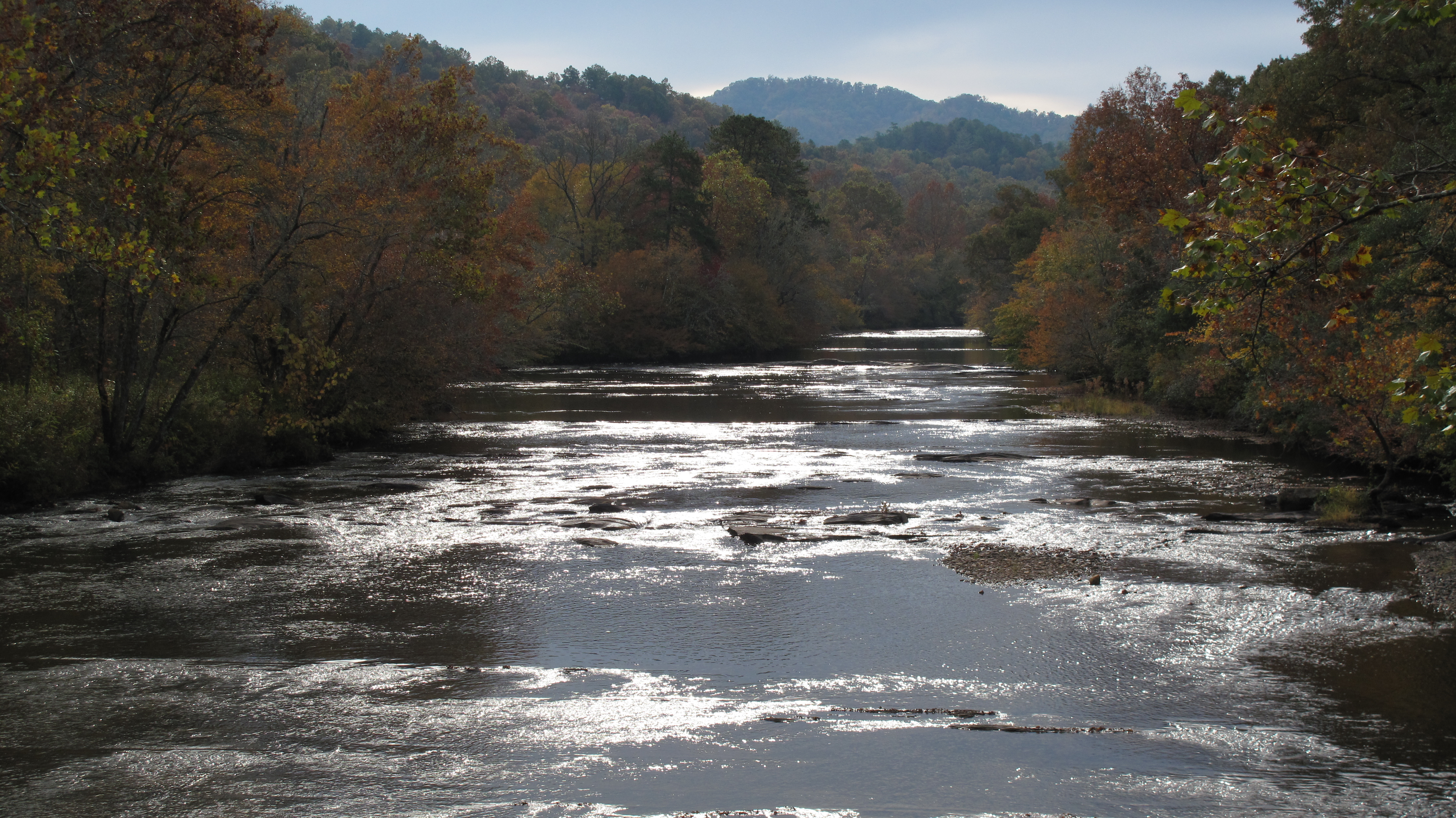
The Little Tennessee River in Swain County, North Carolina, in 2010. Prior to the Tellico Dam, the river resembled this portion in the Little Tennessee Valley.

The Tellico Project was revealed to the public as early as 1960, with reactions similar to previous TVA projects. Public meetings commenced throughout the Little Tennessee Valley in the mid-1960s at civic spaces in Loudon, Blount, and Monroe counties to address concerns raised by citizens about the Tellico and Timberlake projects. At the time, TVA officials did not expect that the Tellico Project would be met with anything more than token opposition. In 1963, small clusters of Little Tennessee Valley landowners and businesspeople formed a community group known as the Fort Loudoun Association opposing the Tellico project. Extensive local opposition emerged at a public forum on September 22, 1964, at Greenback High School in the town of Greenback, located on the proposed eastern shore of the Tellico reservoir. Four hundred residents attended with over 90% reporting strong opposition. Attendees grew hostile, perceiving the Tellico project as an intrusion. One month after the contentious meeting at Greenback High School, anti-Tellico individuals formed a larger opposition group, the Association for the Preservation of the Little Tennessee River. This move showed that project opposition was not one that "would easily buckle and roll over before the mighty presence of the Tennessee Valley Authority".

The property acquisition phase of the project required the use of eminent domain, a statutory right granted to TVA at its establishment by Congress in 1933. This legal authority allowed TVA to take ownership of private property for uses the TVA deemed to be for public benefit. Many property owners concerned about seizure of land reported that TVA personnel provided "taking lines" about the extent of private land acquisition that was planned. Many viewed these actions as TVA overreaching their authority, provoking more public opposition to the project. Compared with TVA's early hydroelectric projects, the documentation of residents to be relocated was poorly executed. TVA officials did not document the exact number of families that were affected, even after the property acquisition process had started in 1963. Initial estimates suggested the removal of 600 families, whereas the actual number was closer to 350 families. The individuals in each of these 350 families were not recorded. Most of the families who were required to move complied, but three unwilling property owners were evicted by U.S. Marshals and watched their houses being demolished as they were evicted. The Tellico project also had a significant impact on farming, with 330 farms along the Little Tennessee River lost following inundation. In total, $25.5 million was spent by the TVA for land acquisition.

== Engineering and construction ==
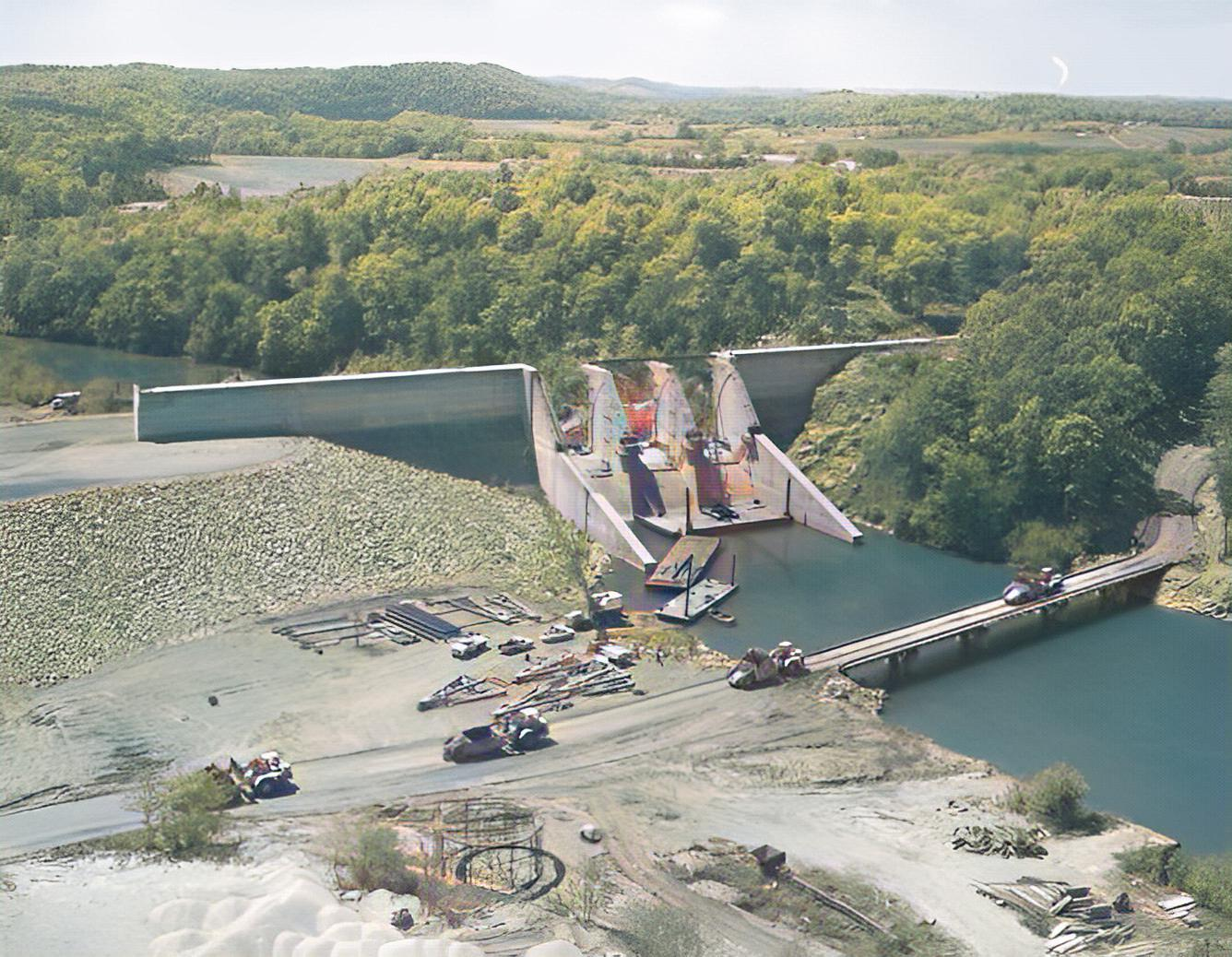
Construction on the Tellico Dam concrete structure in 1967

The engineering design of the Tellico Dam project consisted of a 600 ft-long (180 m) by 129 ft-high (39 m) concrete gravity dam with flood gates, a 2,500 ft-long (760 m) earthen dam, and an 850 ft-long (260 m), 500 ft-wide (150 m) navigable canal connecting the Tellico Reservoir impoundment to the Fort Loudoun impoundment of the Tennessee River. The dam itself created the Tellico Reservoir impoundment of the Little Tennessee River. The Tellico Reservoir with a full pool water capacity of 467,600 acre⋅ft (576,800,000 m^{3}), a drainage basin of 2,627 mi^{2} (6,800 km^{2}), and a water surface area of 14,200 acres (5,700 ha). Along the shoreline of the proposed reservoir, roughly 23,600 acres (9,600 ha) would be acquired to be cleared and graded for future residential, commercial, industrial, and recreational area development.

Construction on the Tellico Project began on March 7, 1967, with clearing work for the main dam structure. Work on the concrete structure of the dam was complete by October of the next year. Other portions of the dam constructed with earth fill were complete by August 1975, with the river flow from the original Little Tennessee soon forced via pump through the completed sluice gates of the main concrete dam. Around this time, work on coffer dams to assist with the main dam were complete. By the time of the forced closure of construction, work on the Tellico Project was nearly 90% complete, aside from final land clearing, recreational facility preparation, and a highway system that was nearly finished.

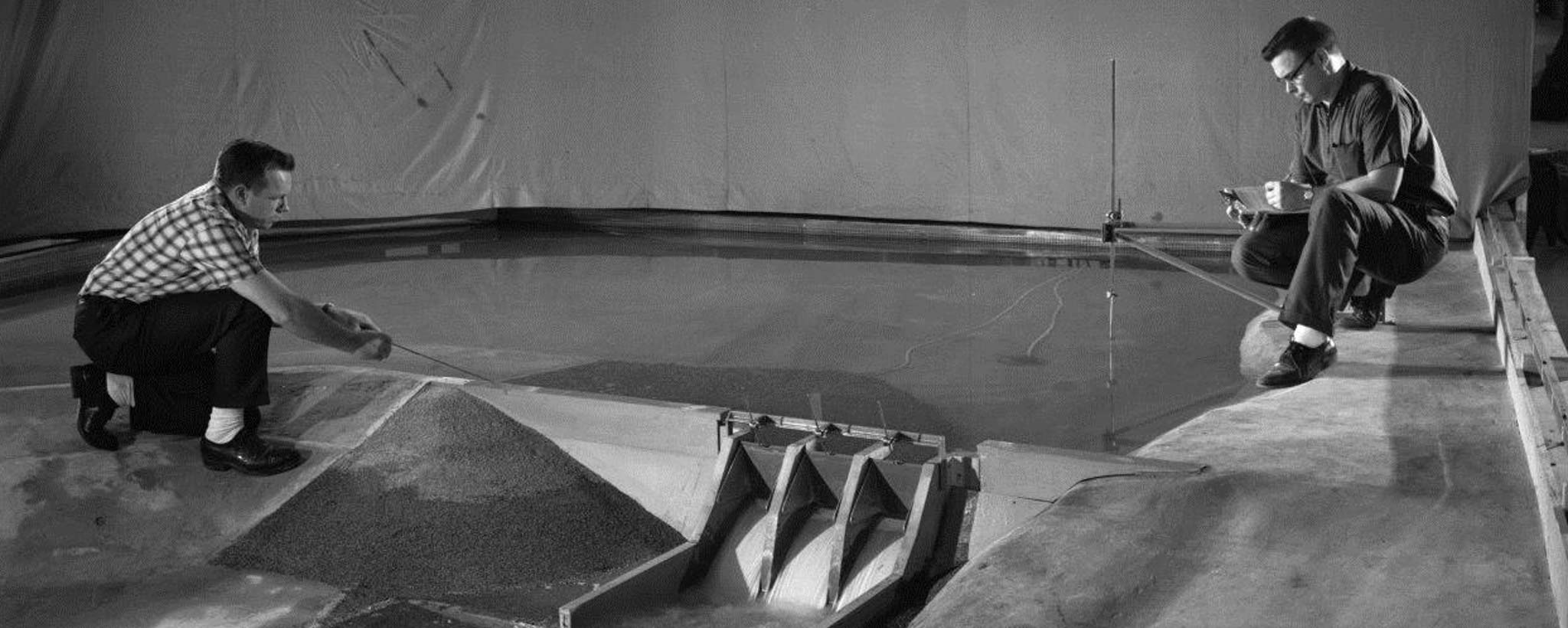
TVA engineers monitoring hydraulics on a prototype of Tellico Dam

In total, $63 million was endowed for the construction of the concrete dam and spillway, the main earth dam, coffer dams, roadway and railroad facilities, reservoir clearing, utility relocations, access roads, a canal with access to the Tennessee River, public use facilities, and general yard improvements. Most of this funding was used for the dam, over 65 miles (105 km) of state, county, and local access roads, and three large-scale bridge replacement projects. The TVA also invested another $3.6 million for two major road projects scheduled for initial work starting after the completion and opening of the Tellico Dam structure. Officials with the Tennessee Department of Transportation expressed doubt about the completion of the Tellico Parkway (State Route 444), one of these major road projects.

The TVA received nearly $665,000 in revenue as the project was underway. Timber cleared for the project provided $99,000 and farmland and housing seized by the agency was leased with a revenue close to $566,000. Labor costs for the project totaled $24.7 million, with most of this associated with the construction of the main Tellico Dam structure. Engineering, planning, and administrative services for the project cost $14.7 million.

== Environmental impacts and legal action ==
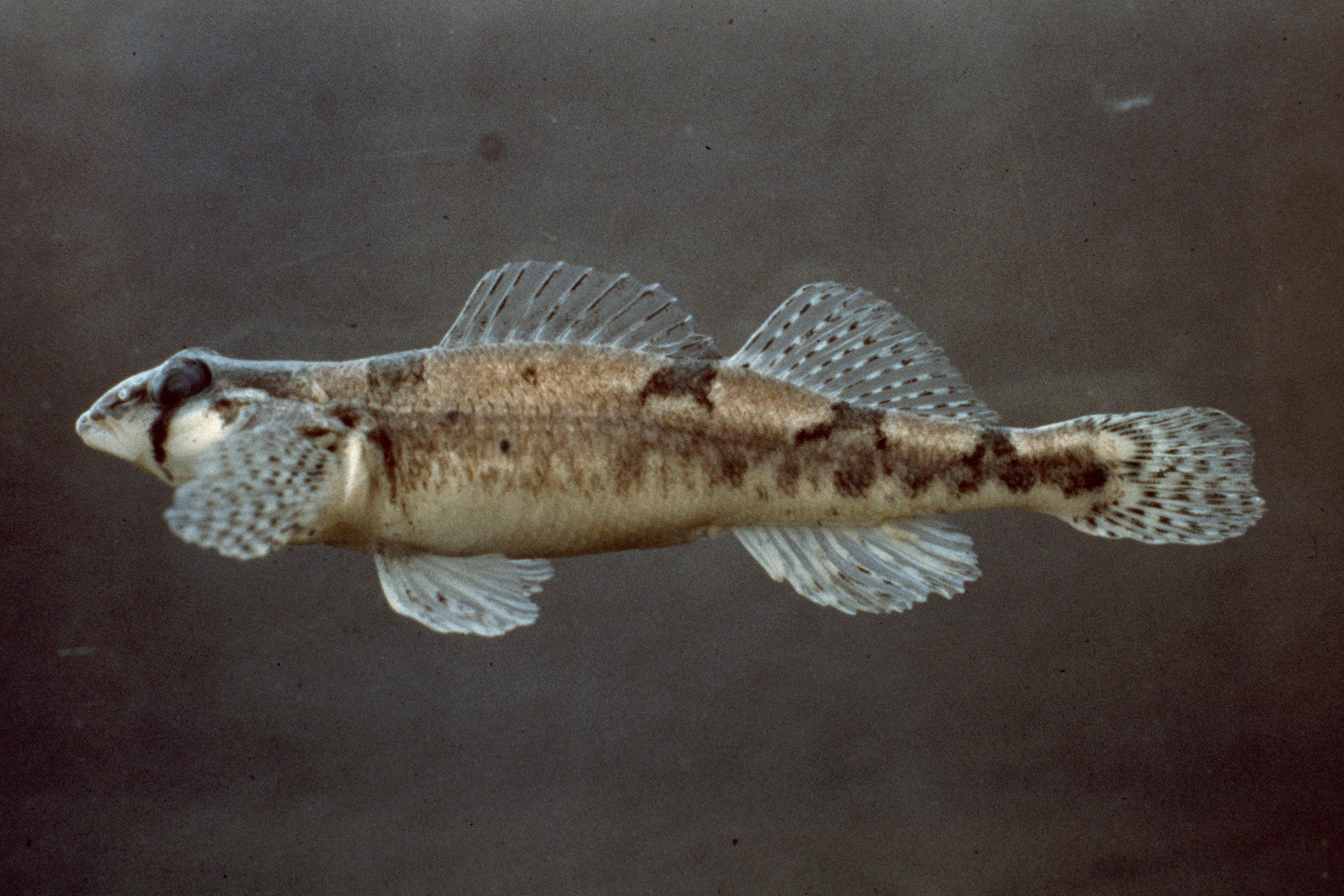
The snail darter fish, endangered at the time of the Tellico project's construction, was the subject of calls to halt work on the dam, and a Supreme Court decision regarding the Endangered Species Act.

Prior to any construction work, the Tennessee Fish and Game Commission addressed concerns to TVA personnel that the construction of Tellico Dam would bring the demise of trout fishing on the Little Tennessee.

TVA attempted to control and defuse local controversy regarding the Tellico Project with the formation of local group known as the Little Tennessee River Valley Development Association (LTRVDA) in 1963. However, within a year, the LTRVDA was unable to control local opposition. Citing the loss of prime farmland, in December 1964 the Tennessee Farm Bureau Association passed resolutions protesting the completion of Tellico Dam. One year later, delegates from the Cherokee Nation filed a petition protesting the desecration of their ancestral lands that were proposed to be flooded for the Tellico Dam. This petition was sent to the office of Supreme Court Associate Justice William O. Douglas, who forwarded the petition to President Lyndon B. Johnson.

In 1971, University of Tennessee, Knoxville (UTK) economics professor Keith Phillips criticized TVA's plans for Tellico Dam in a reappraisal of the project. Phillips found fault with the cost and benefits evaluation conducted by the TVA, and suggested that the agency's officials on the project were technically incompetent.

Following continued press of TVA's excessive and "abusive" power regarding the agency's property acquisition methods for the Tellico Project, Republican governor Winfield Dunn wrote in a 1971 letter of dissent to TVA chair Wagner to stop construction of Tellico Dam, stating that the TVA should recognize "that the Little Tennessee as it now exists is a waterway too valuable for the State of Tennessee to sacrifice." TVA rejected Dunn's request in a letter of response one year later.

Finding an opportunity, Little Tennessee Valley farmers and environmentalists formed a joint activist group known as the Environmental Defense Fund (EDF) in 1972. The EDF brought suit against TVA under the National Environmental Policy Act (NEPA), claiming that no environmental impact statement (EIS) had been made, violating the NEPA. In court, TVA personnel presented an EIS completed prior to the lawsuit by the EDF. The case was dismissed, allowing construction to continue without disruption.

=== Discovery of the snail darter ===
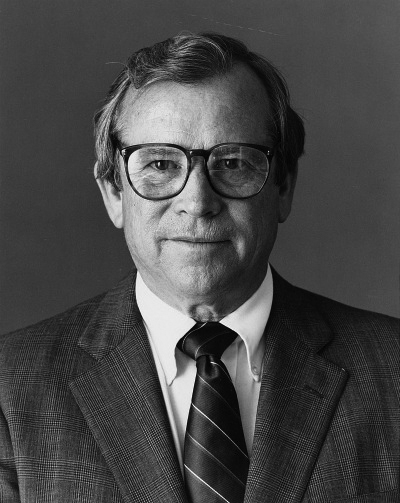
U.S. senator from Tennessee Howard Baker openly supported the completion of the Tellico Dam, and had referred to the snail darter as his "nemesis."

On August 12, 1973, a group of students led by UTK biology professor David Etnier conducted a study for possible endangered species via snorkeling in the Little Tennessee River during construction operations on Tellico Dam. Prior to the expedition, Etnier predicted up to ten endangered species occupied the proposed Tellico Reservoir basin. In the Coytee Springs shoal area of the Little Tennessee, Etnier identified several snail darters, to which in a later interview with the Knoxville News Sentinel suggested he "knew nobody had ever seen it before." Four months later, the Nixon administration passed the Endangered Species Act of 1973 (ESA), providing federal protection for endangered species from potential habitat destructions. By this point, the dam was well under construction and already over US$53 million (equivalent to $293 million in 2025) had been spent on the construction work, requiring an injunction to stop the building from continuing and the flooding to happen. On November 10, 1975, the snail darter was placed on the Endangered Species list by the United States Fish and Wildlife Service (FWS).

=== Litigation to protect the snail darter ===
Seeking to protect the snail darter, UTK law student Hiram "Hank" Hill, in collaboration with David Etnier, filed the case Tennessee Valley Authority v. Hill, 437 U.S. 153 in federal court, citing that the TVA was in violation of the ESA. District Court Judge Robert Taylor declined an injunction to order the cessation of construction work on Tellico Dam on May 25, 1976.

However, on January 31, 1977, the District Court's decision was reversed and construction on the dam was ordered to stop, following an injunction from the United States Court of Appeals for the Sixth Circuit. The TVA then petitioned the U.S. Fish and Wildlife Service to remove the snail darter as an endangered species on February 28. The FWS denied this request in December. On behalf of the TVA, the United States Department of Justice filed an appeal against the decision of the 6th Circuit regarding Tennessee Valley Authority v. Hill on January 25, 1978, to the Supreme Court of the United States. In Hill, the Supreme Court affirmed, by a 6–3 vote, the injunction issued by the 6th Circuit Appeals Court to stop construction of the dam. Citing explicit wording of the Endangered Species Act (ESA) to ensure that habitat for listed species is not disrupted, the Court said "it is clear that the TVA's proposed operation of the dam will have precisely the opposite effect, namely the eradication of an endangered species."

=== Aftermath of Supreme Court decision ===
Greenback resident Nellie McCall on her 90-acre farm; McCall was evicted by U.S. Marshals and watched as her home was demolished after refusing TVA offers. McCall had strongly opposed Tellico Dam following her husband's death, brought on from a heart attack induced by the project.

In the ensuing controversy over the snail darter, the Endangered Species Committee (also known as the "God Squad") was convened to issue a waiver of ESA protection of the snail darter. In a unanimous decision, the Committee refused to exempt the Tellico Dam project. Charles Schultze, the chairman of the President's Council of Economic Advisers, later cited economic assessments concluding that, despite the Tellico Dam being 95% complete, "if one takes just the cost of finishing it against the benefits and does it properly, it doesn't pay, which says something about the original design." Following publication of a story by The New York Times (NYT) regarding the death of nearly 100 snail darters during an October 1977 translocation operation, the TVA Director of Information John Van went on damage control in a subsequent NYT editorial, directing the blame towards the lack of adequate netting by the FWS.

=== Intervention by Carter, exemption from ESA ===
After a long battle, Congress exempted the Tellico Dam from the Endangered Species Act by adding a rider clause to an unrelated public works bill. On September 25, 1979, President Jimmy Carter signed the bill exempting the Tellico project from the ESA. Carter had previously and publicly opposed the completion of the dam, but administration officials speculated that an attempt to veto the bill would result in legislative retaliation against Carter's plans for revising treaties for the Panama Canal Zone's ownership, and the establishment of a federal department for educational affairs, two issues the Carter administration prioritized for passing.

=== Flooding of Cherokee native land ===
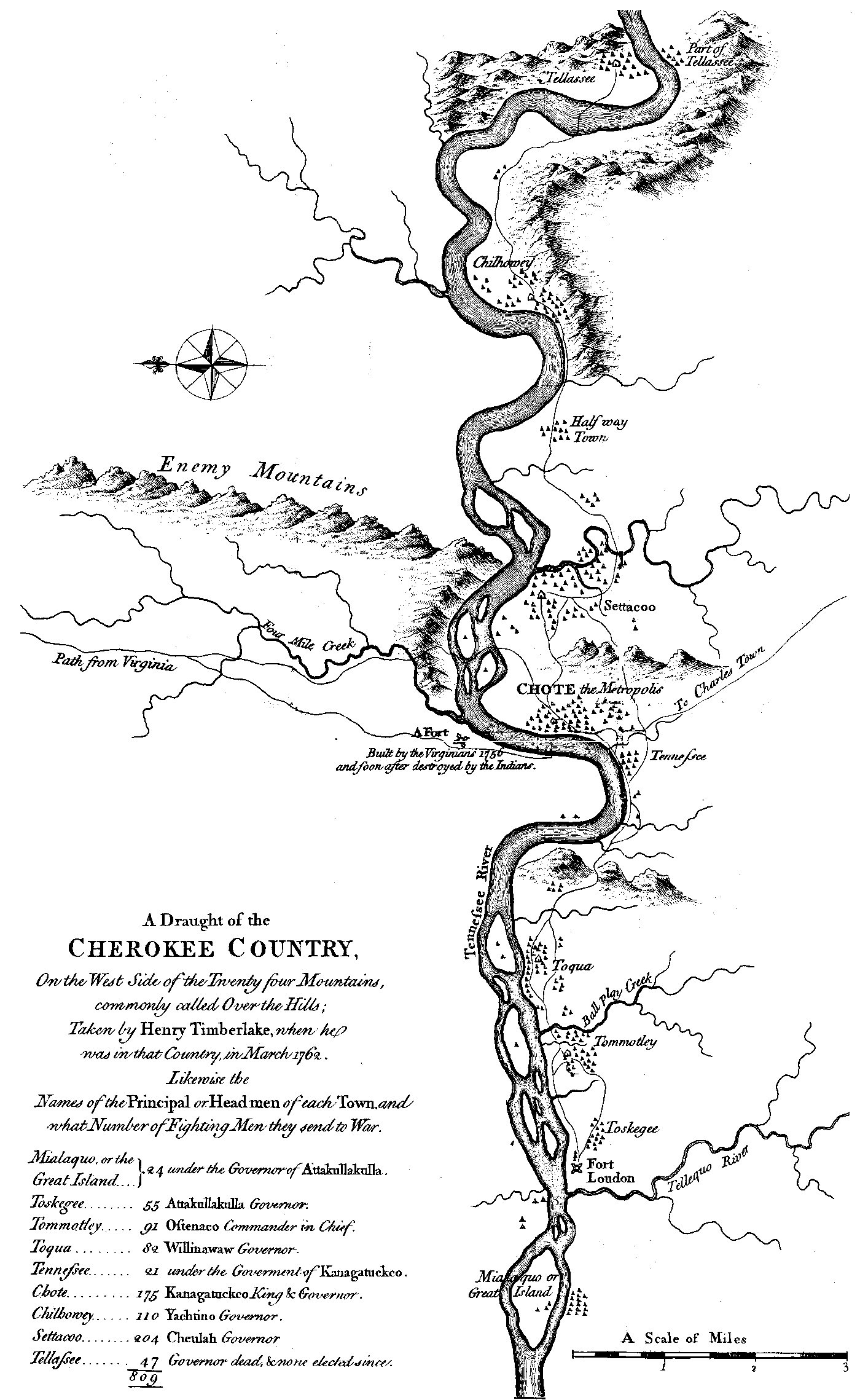
1765 map of Overhill Cherokee tribal towns, the river shown is the Little Tennessee prior to its inundation for the Tellico Project.

In 1979, three Cherokee individuals and two Cherokee bands/organizations filed suit in federal court against the TVA to restrain the flooding of sacred homeland in Sequoyah v. Tennessee Valley Authority, to no avail. Archeological surveys and salvage excavations were conducted in some areas because this area was known to have contained numerous 18th-century Overhill Cherokee towns. But the sites of Tanasi, Chota, Toqua, Tomotley, Citico, Mialoquo and Tuskegee were all flooded by the reservoir behind the dam. Some of these had been occupied by ancestors of the Cherokee for up to 1,000 years, based on the earthwork platform mounds built at their centers by people of the South Appalachian Mississippian culture. In their succeeding long occupancy, the Cherokee had built councilhouses on top of the mounds. In addition, other prehistoric sites, dating to as early as the Archaic period, were flooded.

=== Other impacts ===
The town of Morganton and its river port was submerged by the Tellico reservoir. The British colonial Fort Loudoun was relocated from its original site by excavation of soil required to raise the site by 17 ft (5 m), and the fort was reconstructed into a state park. The creation of Tellico Lake also resulted in the prehistoric Icehouse Bottom site being submerged.

=== Translocation of snail darters ===
Remnant populations of the snail darter were later removed from the Little Tennessee River and translocated into other streams. In total, 219 snail darters were removed from the Tellico basin. Most of these were transferred to the Hiwassee River in Polk County in southeast Tennessee, and were established by 1982. The Holston, French Broad, Nolichucky rivers of central East Tennessee have also been established as habitats for the snail darter.

== Completion and recent history ==
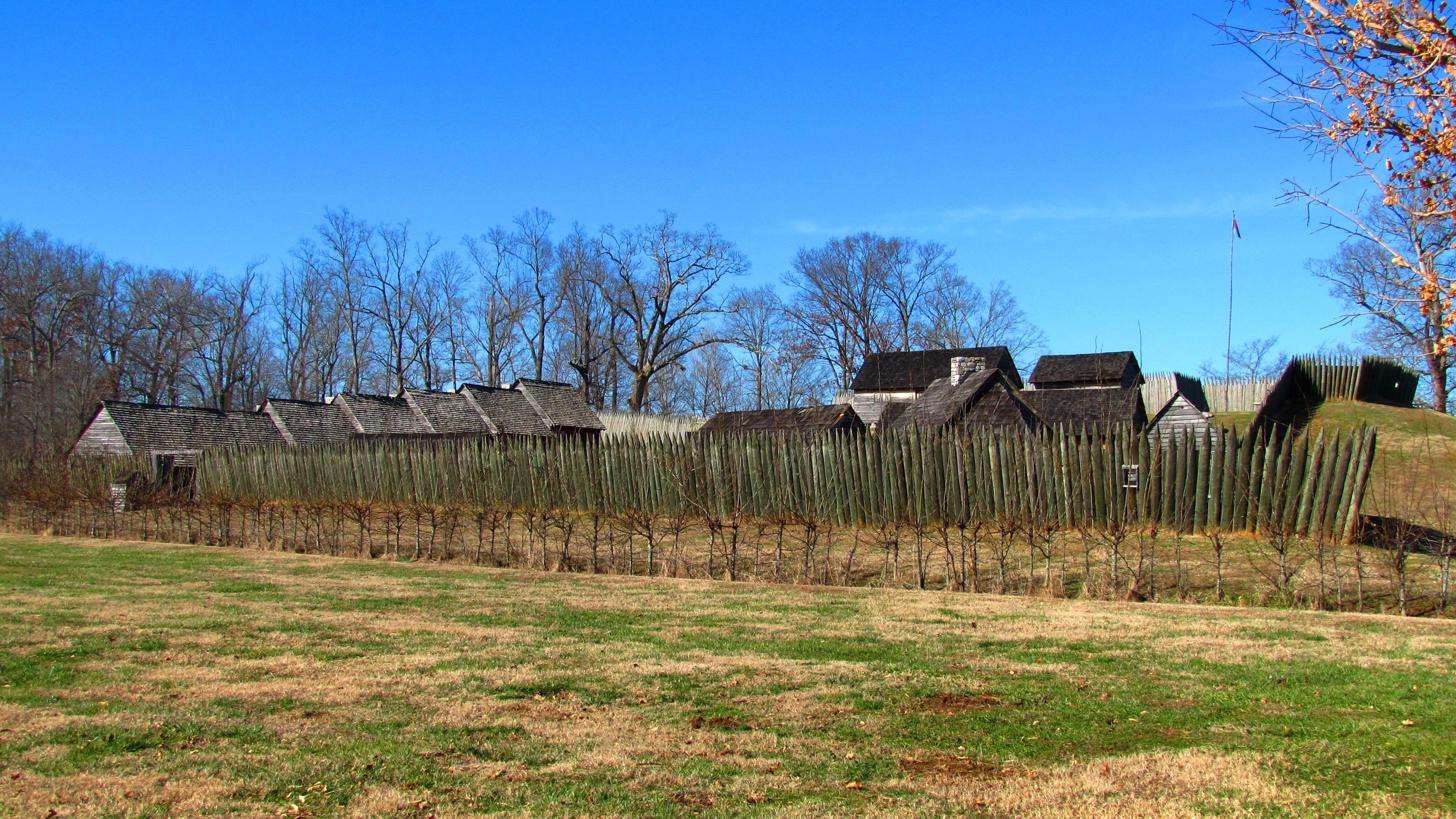
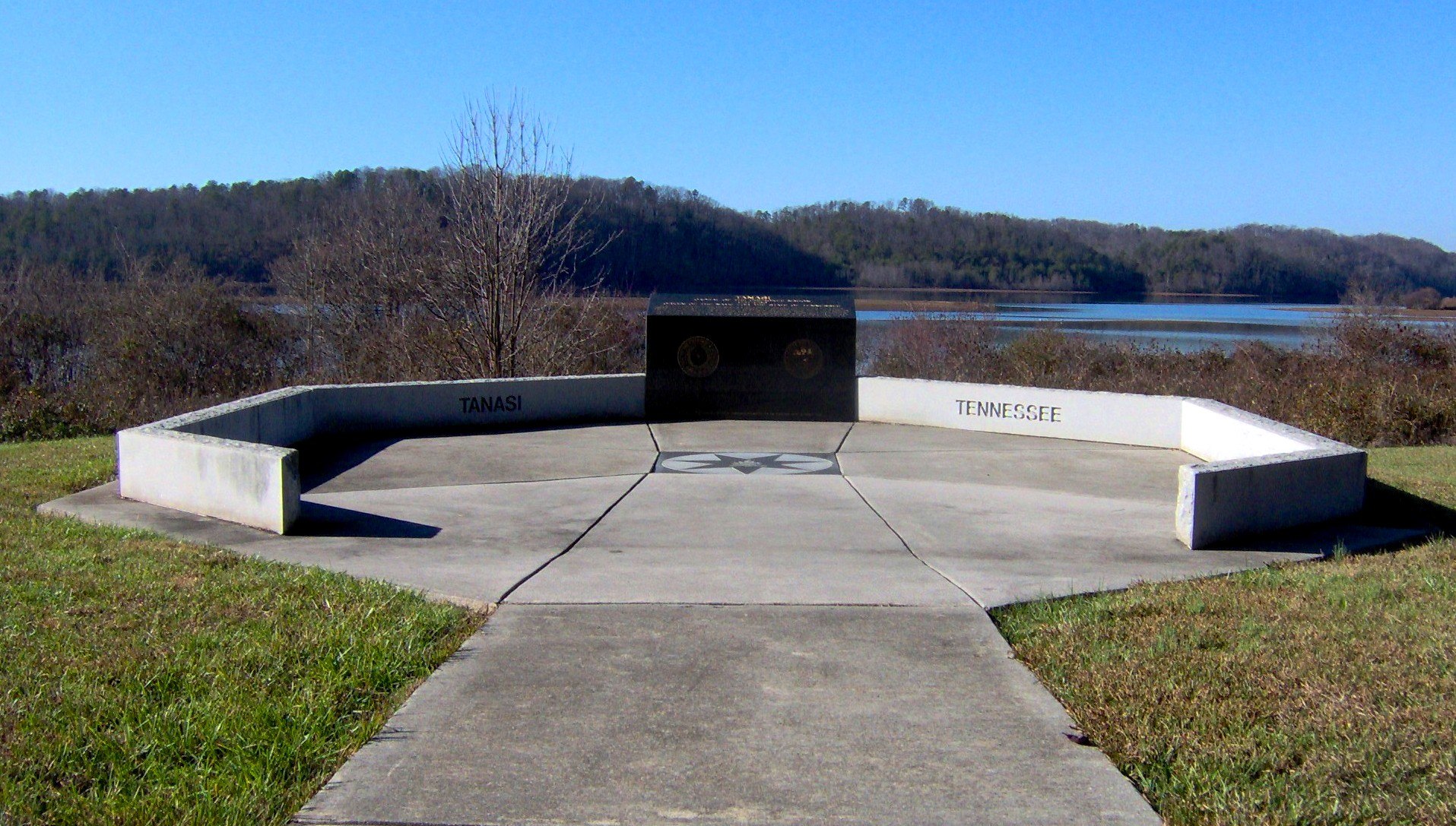
The original location of two historic sites, Fort Loudoun, the first British outpost in Tennessee, and Tanasi, a Cherokee tribal village that Tennessee's naming originated from, were permanently lost with Tellico Project's completion. Fort Loudoun would be reconstructed on a new site (top image), and a monument was constructed near the original site of Tanasi (bottom image).

Tellico Reservoir began filling on November 29, 1979, after the gates were closed on the dam.

Still intent on development projects to improve the economic conditions of the Little Tennessee Valley, TVA began sales on lakefront acreage that the agency seized through eminent domain. Many impacted landowners were unable to qualify to bid on their former properties. Respective analysis of TVA's acquisition methods with the Tellico Project have been cited as abuse of property rights.

In April 1982, the Tellico Reservoir Development Agency (TRDA) was established by the Tennessee state legislature with state and TVA funding, to promote economic development initiatives in the Tellico region. The TRDA assisted in the creation of several industrial parks for corporate investment seeking to reduce local unemployment. In September of the same year, the TVA proposed constructing toxic waste dumps on Tellico-acquired sites. One of these development sites known as the Tellico Peninsula, was billed as the prime site in the Tellico area. Despite several attempts, the Tellico Peninsula site has remained largely undeveloped since site preparation work was completed in the 1980s, aside from a Christensen Shipyards facility which closed following the Great Recession in 2011. In 2017, proposals were announced for the site to be redeveloped into a mixed-use community.

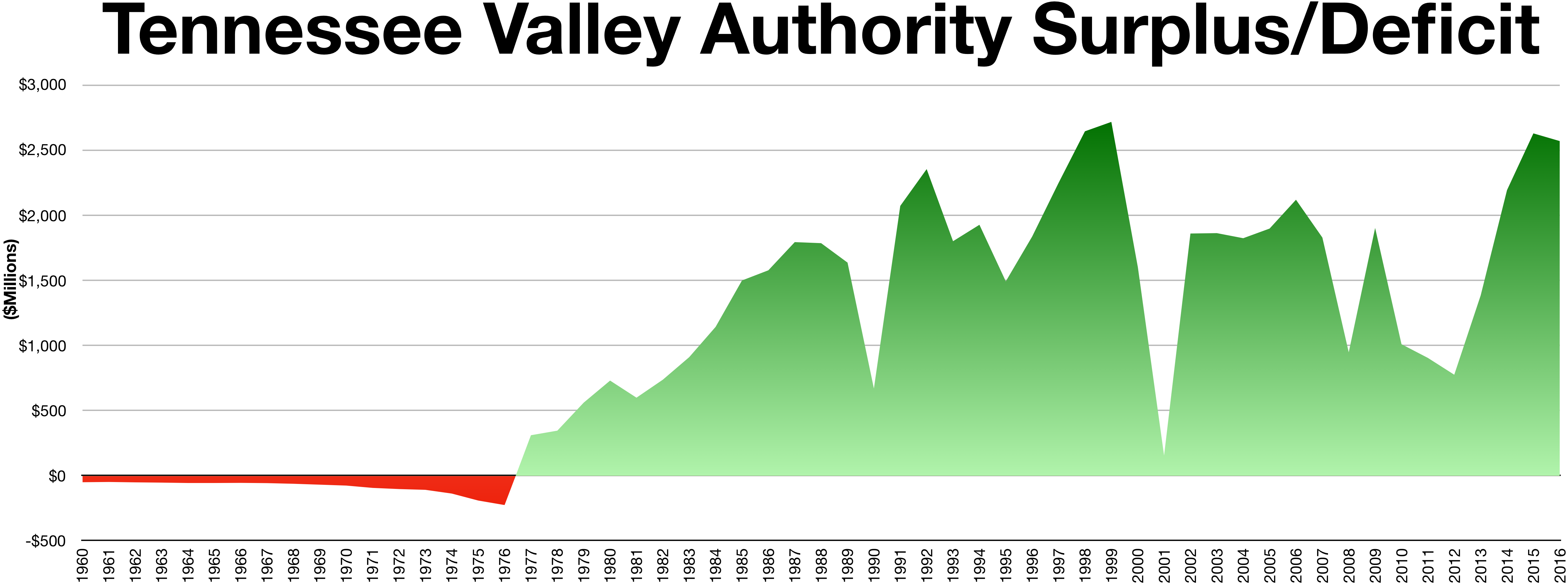
The TVA's surplus witnessed substantial growth following the years of the Tellico Dam's completion partly due to the profits from the sale of Tellico-acquired land for private development.

=== Resort development ===
The residential component of the failed Timberlake project was relaunched in late 1984 with the purchase of roughly 4,800 acres (1,900 ha) along the western shore of the Tellico Reservoir by Cooper Communities Inc. (CCI), a real estate firm based out of Bella Vista, Arkansas. The development became a planned retirement community known as Tellico Village that officially opened in March 1986. CCI promoted Tellico Village and the Tellico Reservoir at golf and boat conventions across the Midwestern United States. Since the development of Tellico Village, the Tellico area has drawn retirees from the Midwest and Florida, initiating a retirement-oriented real estate boom in the area.

By the late 1990s and into the 2000s, the TVA was pressured by private development groups to release additional acreage that had been seized via eminent domain along the shoreline of several reservoirs. The intention was for predominantly golf course-based residential resorts. In 1995, a 960-acre community known as Rarity Bay was constructed, including an equestrian center and 18-hole golf course. Mike Ross, the developer behind Rarity Bay built several additional resort developments on TVA's shoreline property, before being charged in federal court with mail fraud and money laundering in 2012.

In 2002, the TVA board of directors approved the sale of preserved land on the eastern shore of Tellico Reservoir for a $750 million golf-course community known as Rarity Pointe. In 2012, Rarity Pointe was purchased by WindRiver Management LLC, leading to expansion of the site and the renaming of the community from Rarity Pointe to WindRiver.

=== Snail darter post-Tellico ===
The snail darter was removed from the Endangered Species list by the U.S. Fish & Wildlife Service on August 6, 1983. The fish was still classified as a threatened species because the Hiwassee River, where the snail darters from the Little Tennessee had been translocated, had a previous history of acid spills from freight train accidents. By 2021, the snail darter was removed as a threatened species, with the FWS reporting the snail darter population had recovered from any risk of endangerment.

=== Aftermath of the Tellico project ===
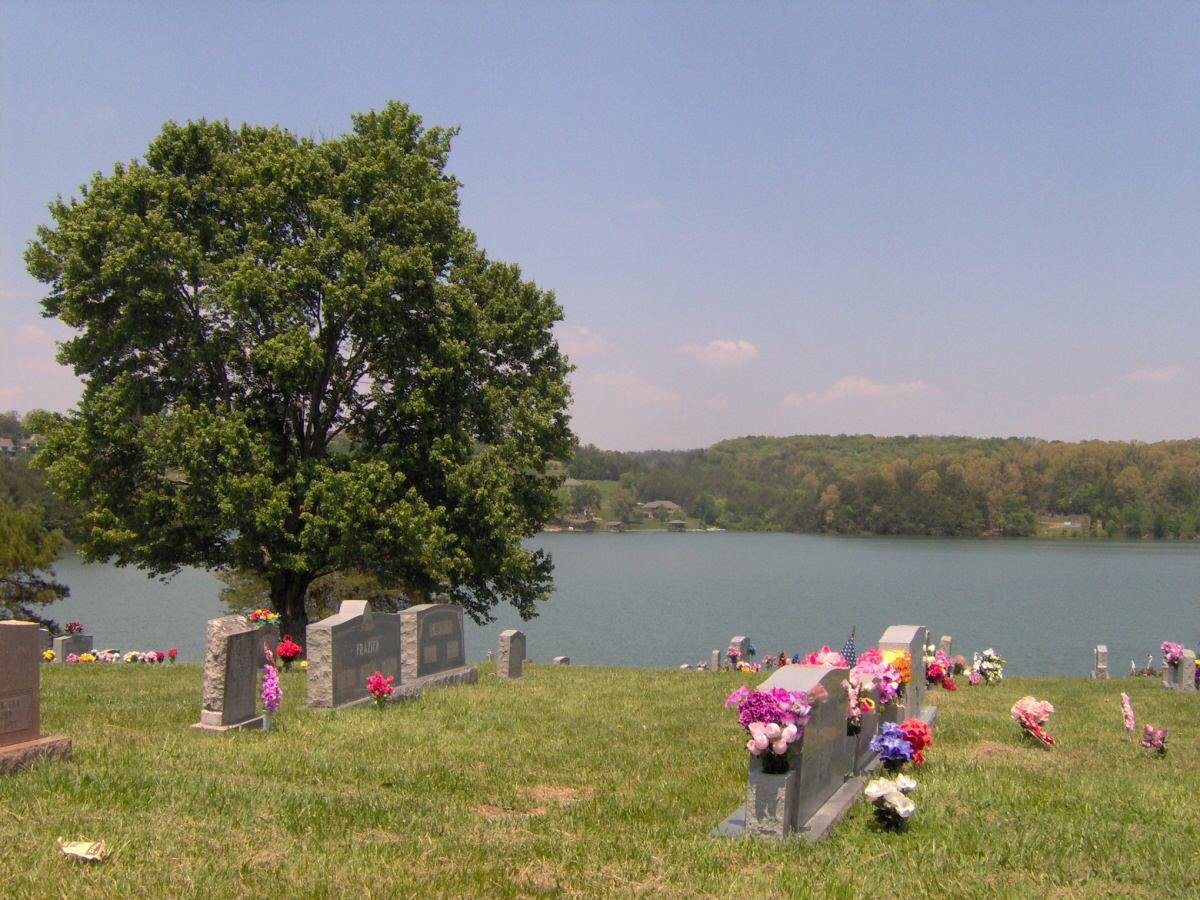
The relocated Morganton Cemetery; the cove in the background is the former site of Morganton

As of 2022, the Tellico Dam remains the last dam to be built by the TVA. Until the events of the Tellico Project, the moral and economic value of building a dam was rarely questioned; dams were widely considered to represent progress and technological prowess. Throughout the 20th-century, the United States had built thousands of dams, often to generate hydroelectric power and provide flood control. By the 1950s, most of the adequate dam sites in the United States had been used, and it became increasingly difficult to justify new dam projects. Government agencies such as TVA, the Bureau of Reclamation, and the Army Corps of Engineers continued to construct new dams, often at the behest of congressional representatives of impacted areas such as in the case of Tellico Dam. However, by the 1970s, the era of dam-building effectively ended in the U.S. with the Tellico Dam case illustrating changing attitudes. Retrospective analysis of the Tellico Dam case has referred to the project as a pork barrel.

From 1933, with the beginning of the pivotal Norris Project to the end of the Tellico project in 1979, TVA had forcibly removed more than 125,000 residents of the Tennessee Valley. The removal of people remains a controversial talking point on the methods and morality of TVA's dam projects. In the 1980s, TVA attempted the construction of a $83 million dam with an intent similar to Tellico, for tourism and economic development on the Duck River near the city of Columbia, Tennessee. The Columbia project resulted in failure, and the 1999 demolition of the unfinished dam as a result of environmental concerns and the escalating costs of completing the project. In 2001, the 13,000-acre area set aside for the project was transferred for public use to the state of Tennessee.

== See also ==
- Bussell Island
- National Register of Historic Places listings in Loudon County, Tennessee
- United States energy law
