= Mialoquo (Cherokee town) =

- U.S. National Register of Historic Places
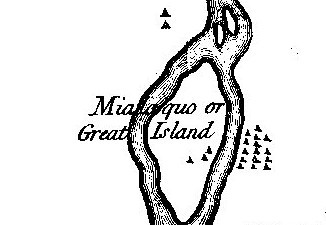
- Mialoquo on Henry Timberlake's 1762 "Draught of the Cherokee Country"
- Location: Monroe County, Tennessee
- Nearest city: Vonore
- Coordinates: 35.61534°N 84.24048°W
- Built: c. 1760 A.D.
- NRHP reference No.: 78002616
- Added to NRHP: 1978

Mialoquo (also "Malaquo", "Big Island", or "Great Island") is a prehistoric and historic Native American site in Monroe County, Tennessee, in the southeastern United States. The site saw significant periods of occupation during the Mississippian period (c. 1000-1600 AD) and later as a Cherokee refugee village. While the archaeological site of Mialoquo (Cherokee: ᎠᎹᏰᎴᏆ, romanized: Amayelequa) was situated on the southwest bank of the Little Tennessee River, the village's habitation area probably included part of Rose Island, a large island in the river immediately opposite the site. Rose Island was occupied on at least a semi-permanent basis as early as the Middle Archaic period.

Both the Mialoquo site and Rose Island are now submerged by the Tellico Lake impoundment of the Little Tennessee River. The area is now managed by the Tennessee Valley Authority and the Tennessee Wildlife Resources Agency. Both sites are visible looking north from the U.S. Route 411 bridge over the river in Vonore or looking west from Wildcat Point, a cliff on the eastern bank of the river.

== Geography ==
The Little Tennessee River enters Tennessee from a gap between the Great Smoky Mountains and the Unicoi Mountains and flows for just over 50 miles (80 km) before emptying into the Tennessee River. Tellico Lake, created by the completion of Tellico Dam in 1979, spans the lower 33 miles (53 km) of the river. Before inundation, the Mialoquo site was located at the river's Island Creek confluence, just under 17 miles (27 km) above the river's mouth. Rose Island spanned the river between 16.8 miles (27.0 km) and 18.4 miles (29.6 km) above the mouth of the river. Both sites were just south of a bend in the river known as Wears Bend and just north of the river's confluence with the Tellico River.

Wildcat Point, a cliff overlooking the now submerged Rose Island and Mialoquo sites, is connected to Tellico Parkway via a seasonal hiking trail. The hills and knobs that flank the river on both sides are part of the Appalachian Ridge-and-Valley Physiographic Province.

== History ==
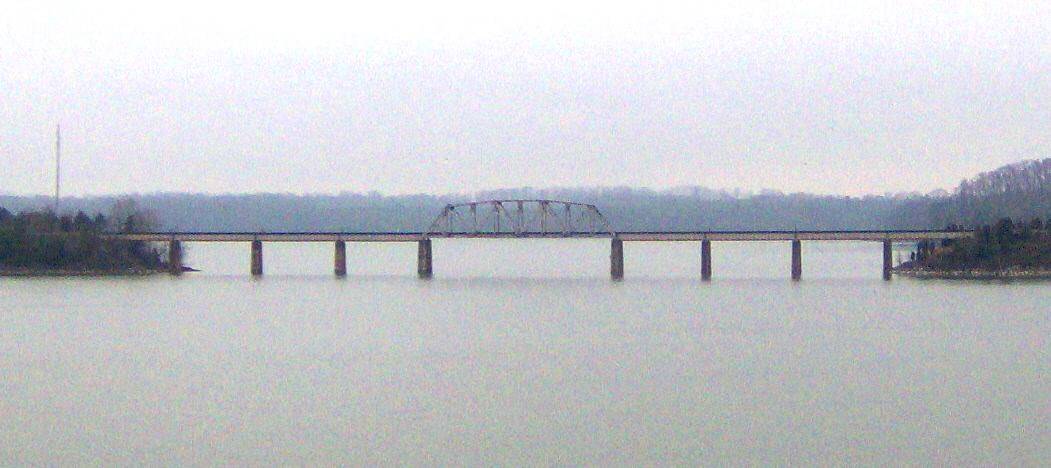
The former site of Mialoquo (just beyond the railroad bridge)

According to ethnologist James Mooney, the term "Mialoquo" comes from the Cherokee word for "Great Island." This name refers to the village's situation on and adjacent to what is now known as Rose Island which was the largest island in the Little Tennessee River before the creation of Tellico Lake. Mialoquo doesn't enter the historical record until 1761, when it appeared on Henry Timberlake's "Draught of the Cherokee Country." Timberlake—visiting the Overhill settlements as a peace emissary—reported 18 houses at Mialoquo, both on the mainland and Rose Island, but doesn't indicate the existence of a townhouse. Timberlake reported 24 Overhill Cherokee warriors residing at Mialoquo under the governorship of Attakullakulla, who at the time was the chief of the nearby village of Tuskegee. Since the Cherokee didn't consider a village a "town" unless it had a townhouse, the lack of a townhouse at Mialoquo may have been the reason for its relatively late appearance in historical records.

Historical evidence suggests Mialoquo may have been formed by refugees fleeing the destruction of the Lower and Middle towns by Colonial forces in 1761. John Norton wrote in his journal that after James Grant destroyed the Cherokee town of Kittowa (near modern Bryson City, North Carolina) that year, the survivors fled to "Big Island." Mialoquo does not appear on a 1757 map of the Overhill towns but appears on Timberlake's map, suggesting the town may have been formed between 1757 and 1761.

By the time the Revolutionary War was being fought, Dragging Canoe had become chief at Mialoquo. In 1776, after the Cherokee aligned themselves with the British, the colonies dispatched Colonel William Christian to subdue the hostile Overhill towns. Christian arrived unopposed and established his headquarters at Mialoquo, where he held peace talks with tribal leaders Attakullakulla and Oconastota. When Dragging Canoe refused to negotiate, however, Christian destroyed Mialoquo and four other Overhill towns.

== Archaeological findings ==
Cyrus Thomas, working for the Smithsonian Institution, conducted a mound survey in the Little Tennessee Valley in the 1880s, and claimed to have located Mialoquo. After the construction of Tellico Dam was announced in 1967, the University of Tennessee conducted salvage excavations at both Rose Island (40MR44) and Mialoquo (40MR3).

=== Rose Island ===
Rose Island was being used by hunter-gatherers on a seasonal basis by 6000 BC, and possibly as early as 7500 BC (the Icehouse Bottom site, which yielded material dating to 7500 BC, was located just over 2 miles (3.2 km) north of Rose Island). These early inhabitants probably made use of the chert outcroppings found in the surrounding hills. Rose Island also saw a period of significant occupation from approximately 350 BC through 100 AD, during the Woodland period.

Archaic period artifacts found on Rose Island include notched and stemmed projectile points, splintered wedges, various ground stone artifacts, and a drill. Woodland period artifacts include projectile points, drills, scrapers, axes, gorgets, and a bird effigy. Several Woodland-period burials were also uncovered at Rose Island.

=== Mialoquo ===
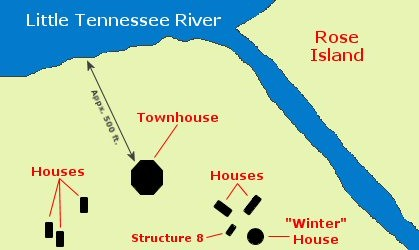
Approximate position of structures uncovered at the Mialoquo site

The Mialoquo site was probably occupied as early as the Archaic period, but to what extent is unknown. Of the 60 features uncovered at the site, 8 (mostly refuse pits) were classified as Mississippian, the rest were Cherokee. The distribution of the features suggests a short-term occupation. The Qualla pottery type— which is associated with the Middle towns in North Carolina— comprised 13.5% of the site's 6,000+ sherds, lending support to the theory that refugees from the Middle towns lived at Mialoquo in the 1760s. The pottery assemblage was similar to that found at nearby Tomotley, also believed to have been a "refugee town."

The features uncovered at Mialoquo included the postmold layouts of a townhouse, 6 dwellings, and one smaller rectangular structure with an unknown purpose. The dwellings included one circular winter structure/rectangular summer structure pairing typical of Overhill houses. The townhouse was octagonal in shape and had a diameter ranging between 52 feet (16 m) to 60 feet (18 m). The rectangular dwellings had lengths ranging from 22 feet (6.7 m) to 32 feet (9.8 m) and widths ranging from 12 feet (3.7 m) to 14 feet (4.3 m). The circular "winter house" had a diameter of 23.5 feet (7.2 m) and the unknown rectangular structure had dimensions of 15 feet (4.6 m) x 9.6 feet (2.9 m).

Nearly 5,000 stone artifacts were recovered at Mialoquo, including projectile points, scrapers, drills, and a stone pipe. Euro-American artifacts uncovered at Mialoquo included tobacco pipes, gun parts and ammunition, glass beads, and two Jew's harps.
