= Tuskegee (Cherokee town) =

Former Overhill Cherokee town in Monroe County, Tennessee

Coordinates: 35.59517°N 84.20227°W

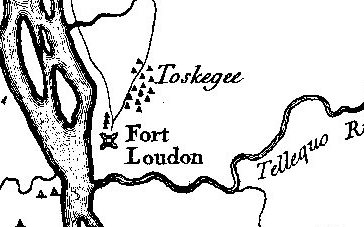
Tuskegee ("Toskegee") and Fort Loudoun, as they appeared on Henry Timberlake's "Draught of the Cherokee Country"

Tuskegee (also spelled Toskegee, Taskigi, and similar variations) was an Overhill Cherokee town located along the lower Little Tennessee River in what is now Monroe County, Tennessee, United States. The town developed in the late 1750s alongside Fort Loudoun, and was inhabited until the late 1770s. It was forcibly evacuated and probably burned during the Cherokee–American wars.

Tuskegee is perhaps best known as the birthplace of Sequoyah (Cherokee, c.1770-1843), a craftsman and polymath who independently created the Cherokee syllabary as an effective writing system for his language. He is one of the few people from a pre-literate society known in recorded history for such an achievement.

The Tuskegee town site was investigated by archaeologists in the 1970s, as part of a survey and excavations of known sites prior to inundation of the valley after completion of the Tellico Dam in 1979.

== History ==
Early explorers made several maps and wrote accounts of the Overhill country, but Tuskegee is not mentioned or noted before 1757. However, a map by William G. De Brahm, the engineer who designed the fort, notes a place called "Taskigee old Town" near one of the proposed sites for the fort (the term "old town" often denoted a cleared or previously inhabited area, and this area is known to have been inhabited for thousands of years by indigenous peoples).

Historians generally believe that the Cherokee town of Tuskegee (also spelled Toskegee) developed here following the construction of Fort Loudoun (1756–1757) by the British colony of South Carolina. A map of the area drawn in either 1756 or early 1757 by John Stuart, an officer in Fort Loudoun's garrison, does not note Tuskegee.

Similarly, early correspondence of Fort Loudoun's garrison does not mention Tuskegee and typically uses Tomotley, a Cherokee town located further upriver to the south, as a reference point. Tuskegee is first mentioned in a letter from the fort dated January 11, 1757. Thereafter, the town is frequently mentioned as having the same location as Fort Loudoun.

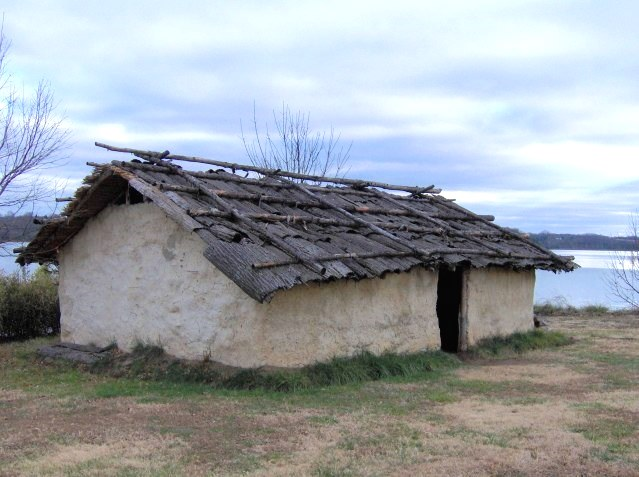
Reconstructed Cherokee "winter" house at Fort Loudoun

After the Cherokee forced the fall of Fort Loudoun, were invaded, and subsequently signed a peace treaty with South Carolina, Virginia sent a peace delegation led by Henry Timberlake to visit the Overhill country in late 1761 and early 1762. Timberlake's map, entitled "Draught of the Cherokee Country," gives detailed information on several Overhill towns, including Tuskegee. On the map, Tuskegee (spelled "Toskegee") is indicated by seventeen structures (probably houses) scattered across the area just south of Fort Loudoun, including three which stand in a line immediately south of the fort. Tuskegee is one of three towns on Timberlake's map that lacks a communal townhouse (the other two being Tanasi and Mialoquo), suggesting that it was a smaller settlement. Timberlake noted that Attakullakulla was the head-man of both Tuskegee and Mialoquo, and that Tuskegee was home to 55 fighters.

In response to a Cherokee attack against the Watauga settlements in the summer of 1776, Colonel William Christian led an invasion force to the Little Tennessee Valley in October of that year. Finding the Overhill towns deserted, Christian burned five, including Tuskegee. This was targeted for retaliation because the Cherokee had killed a settler boy whom they captured during the Watauga attack. Tuskegee was not likely rebuilt or reinhabited after this Anglo-American attack. Subsequent travelers to the area, including those visiting the ruins of Fort Loudoun from the American Tellico Blockhouse in the 1790s, make no mention of the town.

The Cherokee scholar Sequoyah (c.1770-1843), the creator of the Cherokee syllabary, was born at Tuskegee and lived in this area until the early 19th century. He was the son of a Cherokee woman named Wurtah and Nathaniel Gist, a fur trader. He grew up with his mother and her people, speaking only Cherokee for years. He is one of the few people from a pre-literate society known to have independently created an effective writing system. His syllabary inspired the development of 21 other scripts, used in a total of 65 languages across the world.

In the late 20th century, the Tennessee Valley Authority planned the Tellico Dam on the Little Tennessee River, with an accompanying lake that would flood many Cherokee and older indigenous sites along the river. The historic Tuskegee site was among those flooded after completion of Tellico Dam in 1979. The adjacent Fort Loudoun site was raised above lake operating levels, and the fort was reconstructed. Two Cherokee dwellings, a "summer" house and "winter" house, have been reconstructed just south of the fort to represent Tuskegee. The Sequoyah Birthplace Museum, dedicated to the Cherokee scholar, stands along Highway 360, opposite Fort Loudoun State Park.

== Archaeological work and findings ==
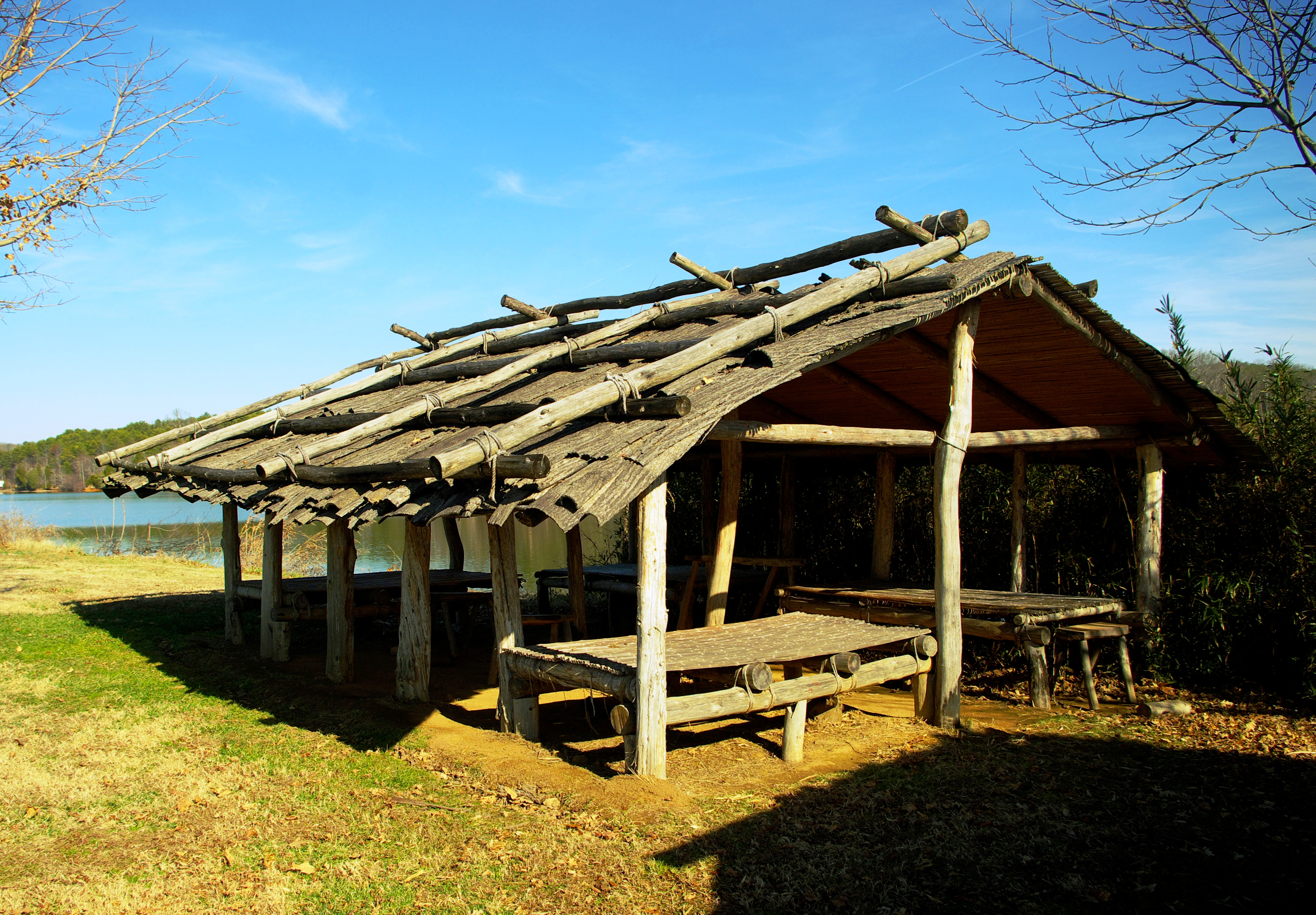
Reconstructed Cherokee "summer" house at Fort Loudoun

The Tennessee Division of Archaeology conducted excavations at the Tuskegee site (40MR4, 40MR24 and 40MR64) in the summer of 1976 in anticipation of the completion of Tellico Dam. Since TVA used the soil around the Tuskegee site for fill dirt to raise adjacent Fort Loudoun above lake operating levels, archaeologists were able to examine a relatively large area around the site (approximately 2.5 acres). These excavations found evidence of twelve structures from various periods dating to the Southern Appalachia Mississippian period, and artifacts from as early as the Archaic period, approximately 7500 BC. (The Tuskegee site lies roughly adjacent to Icehouse Bottom, a key Archaic period site).

Researchers determined that three of the twelve structures discovered during the excavations were Cherokee and appeared to correspond to the three houses just south of Fort Loudoun, as indicated on Timberlake's map. Two of these structures were rectangular, with one measuring 42.6 feet (13.0 m) by 14.7 feet (4.5 m) and the other 43.9 feet (13.4 m) by 21.3 feet (6.5 m). These appear to have been Cherokee "summer" houses (houses with open walls used during warmer months). The third structure was rectangular in shape, but with rounded corners, and measured 25.9 feet (7.9 m) by 20.3 feet (6.2 m).

Several refuse pits uncovered by excavators contained Cherokee artifacts. These included several thousand pottery sherds (primarily of the "Overhill Plain" variety), nails, musket balls, tools and jewelry.
