= Tomotley =

- Tomotley Site
- U.S. National Register of Historic Places
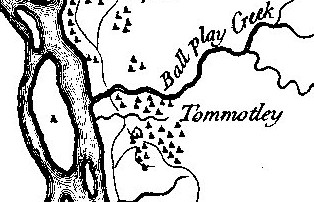
- Tomotley on Henry Timberlake's 1762 Draught of the Cherokee Country
- Location: Monroe County, Tennessee
- Nearest city: Vonore
- Coordinates: 35.57028°N 84.18611°W
- Built: circa 1000 A.D., 1751 A.D.
- NRHP reference No.: 78002617
- Added to NRHP: 1978

Tomotley, Tamatli or Tamahli is a prehistoric and historic Native American site along the lower Little Tennessee River in Monroe County, Tennessee, in the southeastern United States. Occupied as early as the Archaic period (8000 to 1000 BCE), the Tomotley (Cherokee: ᏔᎹᏟ, romanized: Tamatli) site was occupied particularly during the Mississippian culture period, which was likely when its earthwork platform mounds were built. It was also occupied during the eighteenth century as a Cherokee town. It revealed an unexpected style: an octagonal townhouse and square or rectangular residences. In the Overhill period, Cherokee townhouses found in the Carolinas in the same period were circular in design.

In the late 20th century, the Tomotley site was submerged by Tellico Lake, an impoundment of the lower Little Tennessee River and lower Tellico River, after construction of a dam managed by the Tennessee Valley Authority. The site is visible from Toqua Beach and the Toqua Boat Ramp, both of which are managed by the Tennessee Wildlife Resources Agency.

== Geographical setting ==
The Little Tennessee River traverses northern Monroe County for roughly 40 miles (64 km) between its Calderwood Lake impoundment near the Tennessee-North Carolina border and its mouth along the Tennessee River near Lenoir City. The impoundment of the river in 1979 by Tellico Dam created Tellico Lake, which covers the river's lower 33 miles (53 km) as well as the lower 22 miles (35 km) of its tributary, the Tellico River.

The Tomotley site was located along the south bank of the Little Tennessee just north of the confluence of Toqua Creek with the river, nearly 22 miles (35 km) above the river's mouth at the Tennessee River. The Overhill village of Toqua, and its associated prehistoric site, were located on the south side of Toqua Creek, opposite Tomotley.

Toqua Beach and the Toqua Boat Ramp, which overlook the Tomotley site, are located along Tennessee State Route 360 (Citico Road). They are roughly 2 miles (3.2 km) south of the road's junction with U.S. Route 411 in Vonore.

== History ==
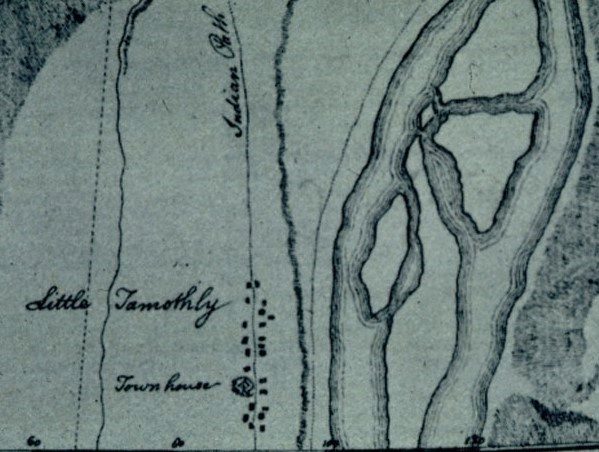
Tomotley, as it appeared on a 1756 map by William de Brahm (the river is on the right)

=== Etymology ===
The root of the name "Tomotley" is unknown, although it is generally believed to have originated before the Cherokee occupation. Ethnologist James Mooney suggested a possible Muscogee Creek origin, pointing out the phonetic similarity to the Creek town of Tama'li, which was located on the Chattahoochee River in Georgia, and Creek occupancy of this area prior to the Cherokee.

Others have theorized that Tomotley was formed by Lower and Valley town Cherokee refugees fleeing warfare with the Creek in the mid-18th century. The name was also used for Lower and Valley Cherokee towns in South Carolina and North Carolina.

=== Town ===
Tomotley first appears in the European colonial historical record in 1756, when it was led by Cherokee chief Attakullakulla. That same year, a small English force under Captain Raymond Demeré arrived in the area to build and garrison Fort Loudoun on the Little Tennessee River near the Tellico. The British were trying to protect the Cherokee, whom they wanted as allies in the French and Indian War.

The garrison was greeted at Tomotley by the chief, Conocotocko (Old Hop), who told Demeré, "I am now old and lie upon a bad bearskin. My life is not more than an inch long." William de Brahm, who designed the fort, resided at Tomotley while the fort was being constructed in late 1756.

Around this time, a sharp political rift occurred in the Cherokee hierarchy between those who were aligned with pro-French and pro-English factions. Tensions were increasing as the French and British were engaged in the Seven Years' War in Europe, known as the French and Indian War on its North American front. When pro-French sentiments began to prevail in the key Overhill town of Great Tellico, its pro-English headman Ostenaco was forced to flee to the Little Tennessee Valley. By the time Anglo-American colonist Henry Timberlake visited the Little Tennessee Valley in the Overhill Country on his peace mission in 1761, Ostenaco was governor of Tomotley (Attakullakulla was listed as governor of the nearby towns of Tuskegee and Mialoquo).

During the American Revolution and Cherokee–American wars, most of the Overhill towns were destroyed by American forces. Because Tomotley was located at a strategic ford along the Little Tennessee, it was the first of the Overhill towns to be captured in 1776 by William Christian's expedition. When John Sevier invaded the valley three years later, he reported that Tomotley was still in ruins.

== Archaeology ==
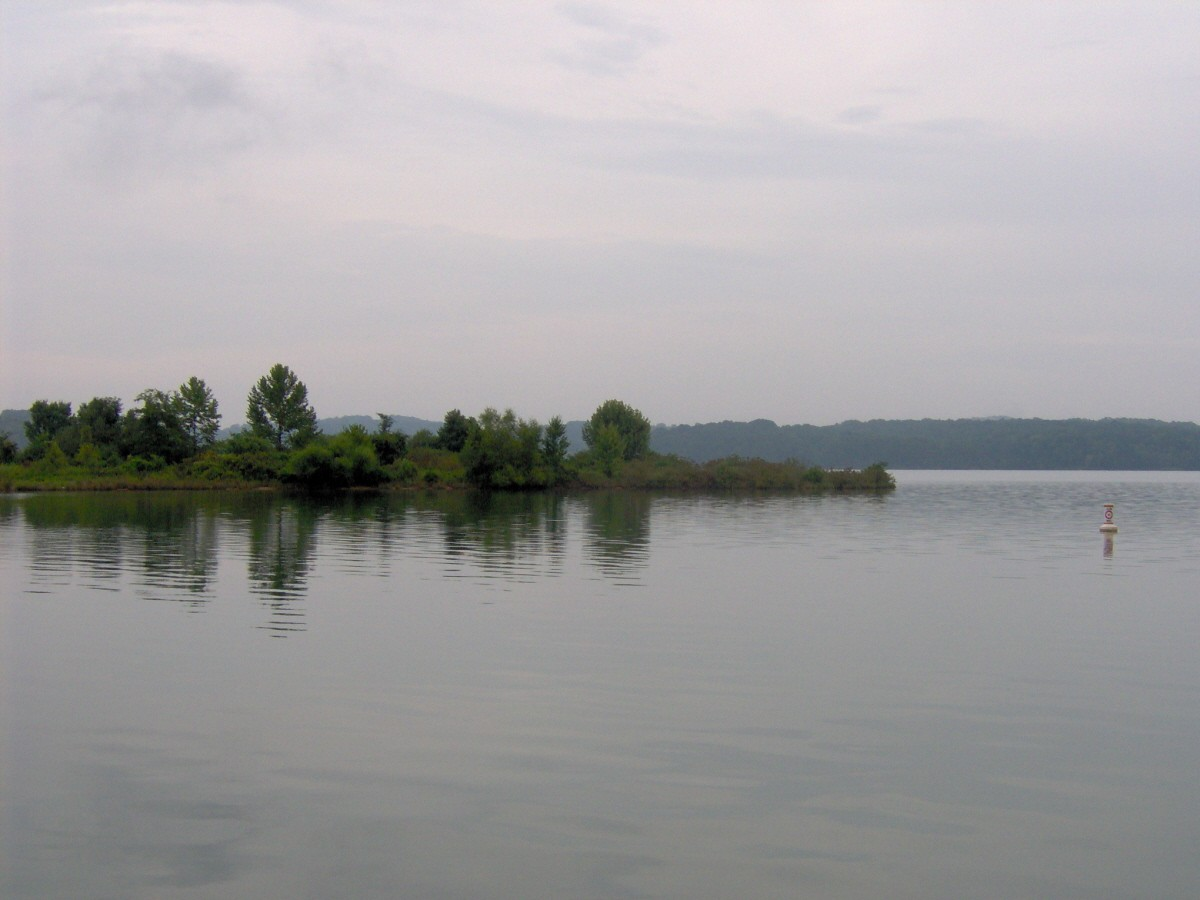
The now-submerged former site of Tomotley

The first major archaeological investigation at the Tomotley site was conducted by J.W. Emmert of the Smithsonian Institution in the 1880s. Emmert located two earthwork mounds at the site, one of which was 8 feet (2.4 m) high and had a diameter of 58 feet (18 m). Both contained human burials.

In the late 20th century, the Tennessee Valley Authority was proceeding with a project to dam the Little Tennessee River and create Tellico Lake, which would flood many significant historic and prehistoric sites. The University of Tennessee Department of Anthropology (under contract with the National Park Service) was commissioned to survey the area in 1967. They conducted test excavations at the Tomotley site that same year in an attempt to locate the historical village. As the Tellico Dam project stalled, more extensive excavations were conducted in 1973, 1974, and 1976. The excavations located 19 Cherokee and pre-Cherokee structures, including Tomotley's Cherokee councilhouse (townhouse), 18 human burials, and several thousand ceramic, stone, and bone artifacts.

While the site yielded evidence of Archaic (8000 to 1000 BC) and Woodland period occupation, excavation revealed that Tomotley's most substantial periods of habitation occurred during the South Appalachian Mississippian culture period (1000-1500 AD), when the earthwork mounds were built; and the Overhill Cherokee period (18th century). Excavations also uncovered a number of Euro-American artifacts, some of which may have originated with the Fort Loudoun garrison.

=== Cherokee habitation ===
Prior to excavation, historians had thought that Tomotley was founded by refugees from the Cherokee Middle, Lower, or Valley towns when they fled warfare with the Creek and later the English, and established Overhill towns. The latter attacked and destroyed their towns in the mid-18th century. The goals of the 1976 excavations were to shed light on this theory by determining the location and structure of Tomotley's councilhouse, analyzing Tomotley's Cherokee dwellings, and establishing the general layout of the village.

In fact, the dwellings excavated at Tomotley provided some of the strongest evidence of occupation prior to the Overhill Cherokee period. Of the 19 structures uncovered at Tomotley, the councilhouse was octagonal, and the rest were either square or rectangular in shape. The lack of circular structures was inconsistent with historical accounts of Overhill Cherokee dwellings, which typically consisted of a circular ("winter") house and a rectangular ("summer") house. Archaeological investigations at Overhill sites such as Toqua, Chota, and Citico also uncovered substantial evidence of such circular structures.

But circular structures were not common among Lower and Valley Cherokee towns in the Carolinas. Other evidence supporting occupation by refugees from these areas includes the ceramic material uncovered during the 1973-1974 excavations. The artifacts bore more similarities to Middle and Chickamauga Cherokee (Lower Cherokee) ceramics than to Overhill ceramics.
