= National Register of Historic Places listings in Loudon County, Tennessee =

Location of Loudon County in Tennessee

This is a list of the National Register of Historic Places listings in Loudon County, Tennessee.

This is intended to be a complete list of the properties and districts on the National Register of Historic Places in Loudon County, Tennessee, United States. Latitude and longitude coordinates are provided for many National Register properties and districts; these locations may be seen together in a map.

There are 24 properties and districts listed on the National Register in the county. Another 2 properties were once listed but have been removed.

Contents: Counties in Tennessee
Anderson – Bedford – Benton – Bledsoe – Blount – Bradley – Campbell – Cannon – Carroll – Carter – Cheatham – Chester – Claiborne – Clay – Cocke – Coffee – Crockett – Cumberland – Davidson – Decatur – DeKalb – Dickson – Dyer – Fayette – Fentress – Franklin – Gibson – Giles – Grainger – Greene – Grundy – Hamblen – Hamilton – Hancock – Hardeman – Hardin – Hawkins – Haywood – Henderson – Henry – Hickman – Houston – Humphreys – Jackson – Jefferson – Johnson – Knox – Lake – Lauderdale – Lawrence – Lewis – Lincoln – Loudon – Macon – Madison – Marion – Marshall – Maury – McMinn – McNairy – Meigs – Monroe – Montgomery – Moore – Morgan – Obion – Overton – Perry – Pickett – Polk – Putnam – Rhea – Roane – Robertson – Rutherford – Scott – Sequatchie – Sevier – Shelby – Smith – Stewart – Sullivan – Sumner – Tipton – Trousdale – Unicoi – Union – Van Buren – Warren – Washington – Wayne – Weakley – White – Williamson – Wilson

This National Park Service list is complete through NPS recent listings posted September 26, 2025.

== Current listings ==
	Name on the Register	Image	Date listed	Location	City or town	Description
1	Blair's Ferry Storehouse	Blair's Ferry Storehouse	July 14, 1977 (#77001277)	800 Main St. 35°44′27″N 84°20′00″W	Loudon	
2	Bowman House	Bowman House	July 8, 1970 (#70000610)	East of Loudon on Little River Rd. 35°42′51″N 84°15′15″W	Loudon	
3	Bussell Island Site	Bussell Island Site	March 29, 1978 (#78002606)	On Bussell Island in the Little Tennessee River; 35°46′58″N 84°15′23″W	Lenoir City	
4	Cannon-Calloway House		July 8, 1970 (#70000611)	West of Loudon off U.S. Route 11; 35°41′51″N 84°22′44″W	Loudon	
5	Craigs Chapel AME Zion Church	Craigs Chapel AME Zion Church	March 12, 2001 (#01000256)	Craigs Chapel Rd. 35°38′58″N 84°10′22″W	Greenback	Added as part of MTSU's survey of rural African-American churches in Tennessee
6	Cumberland Presbyterian Church of Loudon	Cumberland Presbyterian Church of Loudon	April 15, 1982 (#82003988)	College St. 35°44′28″N 84°20′21″W	Loudon	
7	Dunbar Public School	Dunbar Public School	November 15, 2007 (#07001196)	113 Steekee St. 35°44′14″N 84°20′12″W	Loudon	Currently a community center
8	Fort Loudon Hydroelectric Project	Fort Loudon Hydroelectric Project	August 11, 2017 (#100001469)	1280 City Park Dr. 35°47′27″N 84°14′34″W	Lenoir City	
9	Greenback Depot	Greenback Depot	December 18, 2013 (#13000950)	6736 Morganton Rd. 35°39′40″N 84°10′18″W	Greenback	Built by the L&N in 1914
10	William H. Griffitts House	William H. Griffitts House	March 2, 1989 (#89000141)	Jackson Ferry-Greenback Rd. 35°40′26″N 84°13′39″W	Greenback	
11	Hackney Chapel AME Zion Church	Hackney Chapel AME Zion Church	July 10, 2000 (#00000729)	Junction of Antioch and Hackney Chapel Rds. 35°44′41″N 84°11′49″W	Lenoir City	Added as part of MTSU's survey of rural African-American churches in Tennessee
12	Lenoir City Company	Lenoir City Company	March 19, 1982 (#82003987)	Depot St. 35°47′26″N 84°15′54″W	Lenoir City	Now a museum, originally the main office of the failed Lenoir City Company, c. 1890
13	Lenoir Cotton Mill Warehouse	Lenoir Cotton Mill Warehouse	July 6, 2006 (#06000584)	150 Bussells Ferry Rd. 35°47′13″N 84°15′25″W	Lenoir City	Now a residence, originally a warehouse used by the Lenoir Cotton Mill
14	Albert Lenoir House	Albert Lenoir House	April 11, 1973 (#73001808)	West of Loudon on River Rd. (State Route 72); 35°44′20″N 84°22′21″W	Loudon	Located where River Rd. crosses Sweetwater Creek
15	Loudon County Courthouse	Loudon County Courthouse	May 28, 1975 (#75001768)	Grove and Mulberry Sts. 35°44′28″N 84°20′10″W	Loudon	
16	Mason Place	Mason Place	November 27, 1989 (#89002029)	600 Commerce St. 35°45′01″N 84°20′32″W	Loudon	
17	McCollum Farm	McCollum Farm	April 15, 1978 (#78002605)	Southwest of Greenback on Morganton Rd. 35°39′00″N 84°12′13″W	Greenback	
18	Melton Hill Hydroelectric Project	Melton Hill Hydroelectric Project	August 11, 2017 (#100001470)	2009 Grubb Rd. 35°53′07″N 84°18′00″W	Lenoir City	
19	National Campground	National Campground	January 7, 1972 (#72001243)	State Route 1; 35°41′15″N 84°13′24″W	Greenback	
20	Robinson Mill	Robinson Mill	April 5, 1984 (#84003592)	State Route 72; 35°43′24″N 84°19′21″W	Loudon	
21	Tellico Dam Project	Tellico Dam Project	August 14, 2017 (#100001471)	c/o 1280 City Park Dr. 35°46′40″N 84°15′35″W	Lenoir City	
22	War Memorial Building	War Memorial Building	December 29, 2011 (#11000979)	103 N. B St. 35°47′28″N 84°16′02″W	Lenoir City	Constructed as a memorial for local veterans in 1951
23	Orme Wilson and Company Storehouse	Orme Wilson and Company Storehouse	February 12, 1980 (#80003845)	Hackberry St. 35°44′31″N 84°20′05″W	Loudon	Now home to the Wharf Street Coffeehouse; located adjacent to the formerly-listed Carmichael Inn
24	John Winton House	John Winton House	July 17, 2003 (#03000665)	18350 Martel Rd. 35°49′28″N 84°12′53″W	Lenoir City	

== Former listings ==
	Name on the Register	Image	Date listed	Date removed	Location	City or town	Description
1	Carmichael Inn	Carmichael Inn	July 8, 1970 (#70000612)	November 25, 1987	Off US 11; 35°44′31″N 84°20′06″W	Loudon	Relocated into greater Loudon, adjacent to the Orne Wilson Warehouse.
2	Lenoir Cotton Mill	Lenoir Cotton Mill	June 18, 1975 (#75001767)	July 30, 2002	Depot Street	Lenoir City	Destroyed by arsonist in 1991.

== See also ==
- List of National Historic Landmarks in Tennessee
- National Register of Historic Places listings in Tennessee
