= William Lenoir =

William Lenoir may refer to:

- William Lenoir (general) (1751–1839), American Revolutionary War officer and later a general in the North Carolina militia
- William Ballard Lenoir (1775–1852), his son, member of Tennessee state house of representatives, 1815–1817
- William B. Lenoir (1939–2010), American engineer and NASA astronaut
- Billy Lenoir (William Lenoir, 1942–2007), American tennis player
