= Craigs Chapel AME Zion Church =

Historic church in Tennessee, United States

- U.S. National Register of Historic Places
- U.S. Historic district
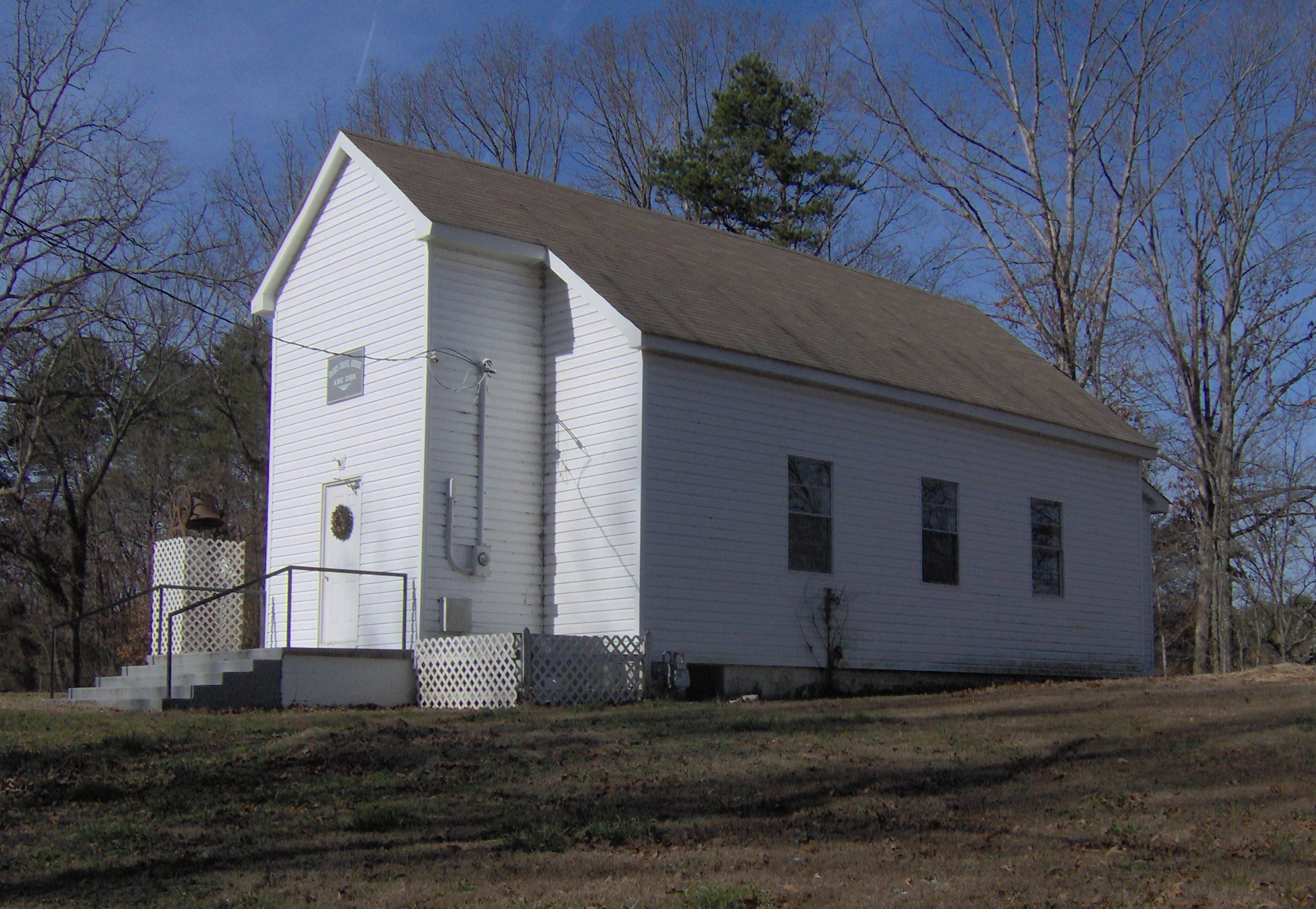

- Location within Tennessee Location within the United States
- Nearest city: Greenback, Tennessee
- Coordinates: 35°38′58″N 84°10′22″W
- Area: 2 acres (0.81 ha)
- Architectural style: gable front form
- MPS: Rural African-American Churches in Tennessee MPS
- NRHP reference No.: 01000256
- Added to NRHP: March 12, 2001

Craigs Chapel AME Zion Church is a historic church in Greenback, Tennessee.

Craigs Chapel is one of several historic African-American churches in rural Tennessee that had a black school and a cemetery located alongside the church, on the same plot of land. The church was built in 1896 and was followed by an elementary school in 1899 and the cemetery in 1903.

It was added to the National Register of Historic Places in 2001.
