= Hackney Chapel AME Zion Church =

Historic building in Loudon County, Tennessee

- U.S. National Register of Historic Places
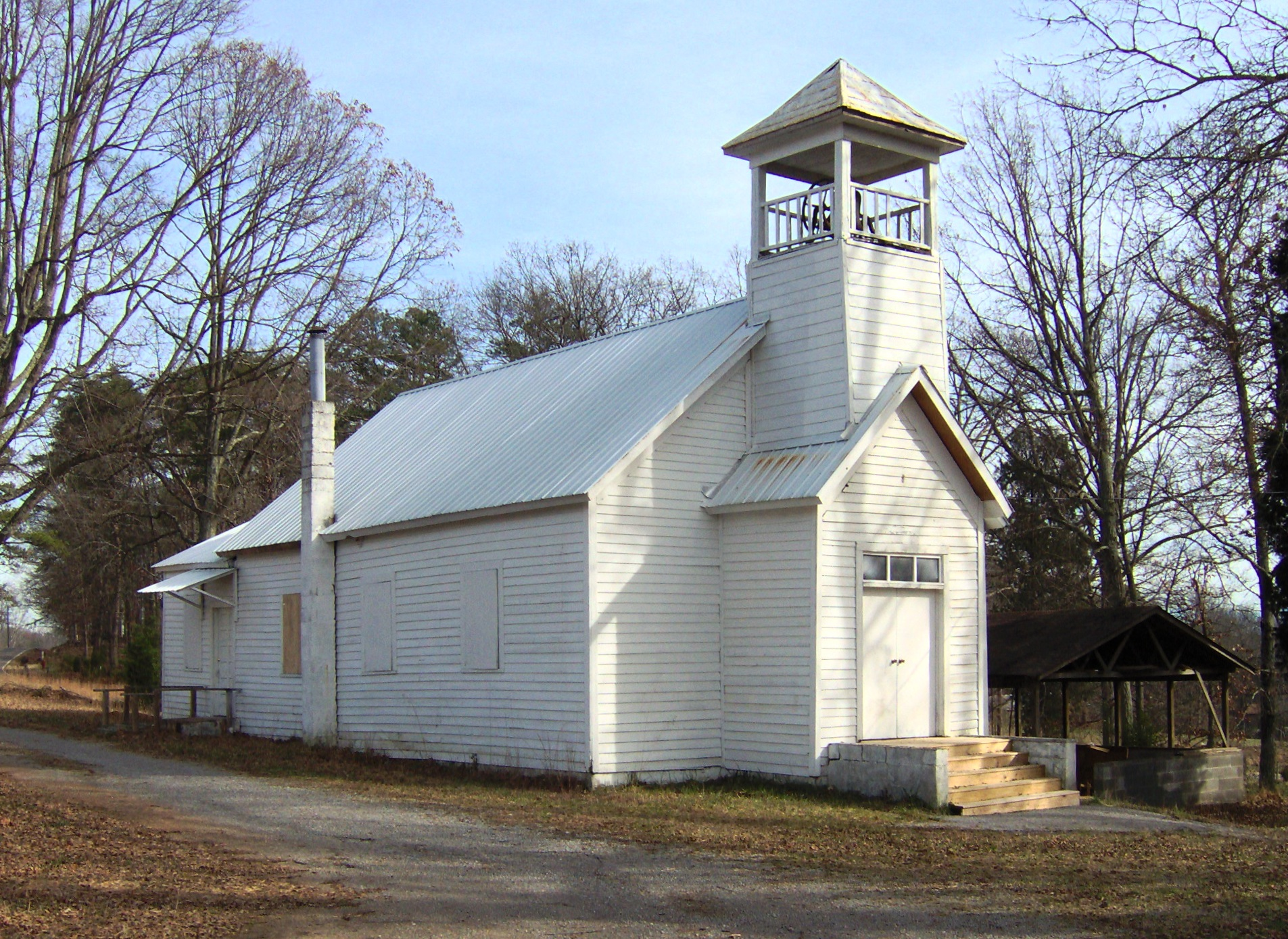

- Location within Tennessee Location within the United States
- Nearest city: Lenoir City, Tennessee
- Coordinates: 35.74471°N 84.19713°W
- Area: 1.37 acres (0.55 ha)
- Built: 1899
- Built by: F. Hackney, J.W. Carter, H.H. Hall, M.M. Lendon
- MPS: Rural African-American Churches in Tennessee MPS
- NRHP reference No.: 00000729
- Added to NRHP: July 10, 2000

Hackney Chapel AME Zion Church, also known as Unitia AME Zion Church, is a historic African-American church in rural Loudon County, Tennessee, United States. The adjacent cemetery has about 100 marked graves and up to 200 unmarked graves. The church and cemetery were added to the National Register of Historic Places in 2000.

== Location ==
Hackney Chapel AME Zion Church is located in the unincorporated community of Unitia approximately 5 miles (8.0 km) southwest of Lenoir City. The church and cemetery sit on 1.37 acres (0.55 ha) of land.

== Church description ==
The Middle Tennessee State University Center for Historic Preservation describes Hackney Chapel as "one of the oldest and least altered churches" that it surveyed for its research on "Historic Rural African-American Churches in Tennessee". The church building is a one-story vernacular rectangular frame structure completed in October 1899 on land donated by F. R. and M. J. Hackney, African-American land owners. An extension on the front of the church building includes a vestibule and a bell tower. An addition on the rear of the building circa 1930 increased the size of the sanctuary and furnished a raised platform for the minister and the choir. The church has a gable roof and the bell tower has a hipped roof; both are covered by standing seam metal roofing. An outdoor picnic shelter was built next to the south side of the building around 1980.

The church building has had electricity since 1952, but lacks plumbing. There are outdoor restrooms with plumbing adjacent to the picnic shelter. Before the picnic shelter and restrooms were installed, an outdoor privy was used; it was still standing as of 1998.

== Cemetery ==
The Hackney Chapel Cemetery was established on the same property in the 1880s (before the church was built); it is located west of the church. The cemetery has about 100 marked graves. A 1980 survey of the burial ground suggested the presence of up to 200 unmarked graves.

== History ==
In the early decades of the 20th century, the church and a black school that was located about one-half mile (0.8 km) away were the focal point of African-American community life in Unitia. The community's population dwindled over time, following the early 1940s inundation of parts of Unitia under the reservoir behind Fort Loudoun Dam, and as community members moved away to more urban areas. The school closed in 1948.

Regular worship at the church ceased in 1988 when the last two members of the congregation, both women, died. Family and friends of the congregation continue to gather at the church annually for a worship service and dinner on the grounds, and to decorate graves in the cemetery.
