= Greenback station =

- Greenback Depot
- U.S. National Register of Historic Places
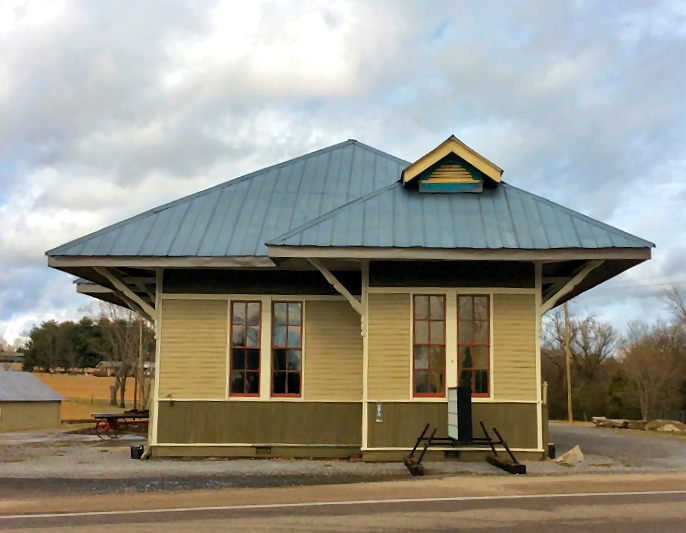
- Greenback Depot
- Location: 6736 Morganton Road; Greenback, Tennessee
- Coordinates: 35°39′40″N 84°10′18″W
- Area: Less than one acre
- Built: 1914
- Architectural style: Craftsman
- NRHP reference No.: 13000950
- Added to NRHP: December 18, 2013

The Greenback Depot is a former railroad station located in Greenback, Tennessee, United States. Built in 1914 by the Louisville and Nashville Railroad (L&N), the depot served rail freight and passengers traveling in and out of the Greenback area until 1954. Restored for use as a community events center by Ronald Edmondson in the early 2010s, the depot was listed on the National Register of Historic Places in 2013 in recognition of its role in the area's transportation history.

== Design ==
The depot is a one-story frame structure measuring 30 feet (9.1 m) by 82 feet (25 m), and clad in weatherboard and bead board. It was a "combination depot," meaning it housed both passengers and freight (stations for larger cities often had separate depots for passengers and freight). The southern half of the building's roof is hipped, and includes south-facing and west-facing dormers. Most of the windows are four-over-four double-hung sash windows with wooden frames, the exception being a clerestory window on the north wall. The depot retains its original wooden doors. Rolling track doors are located on the east side of the building.

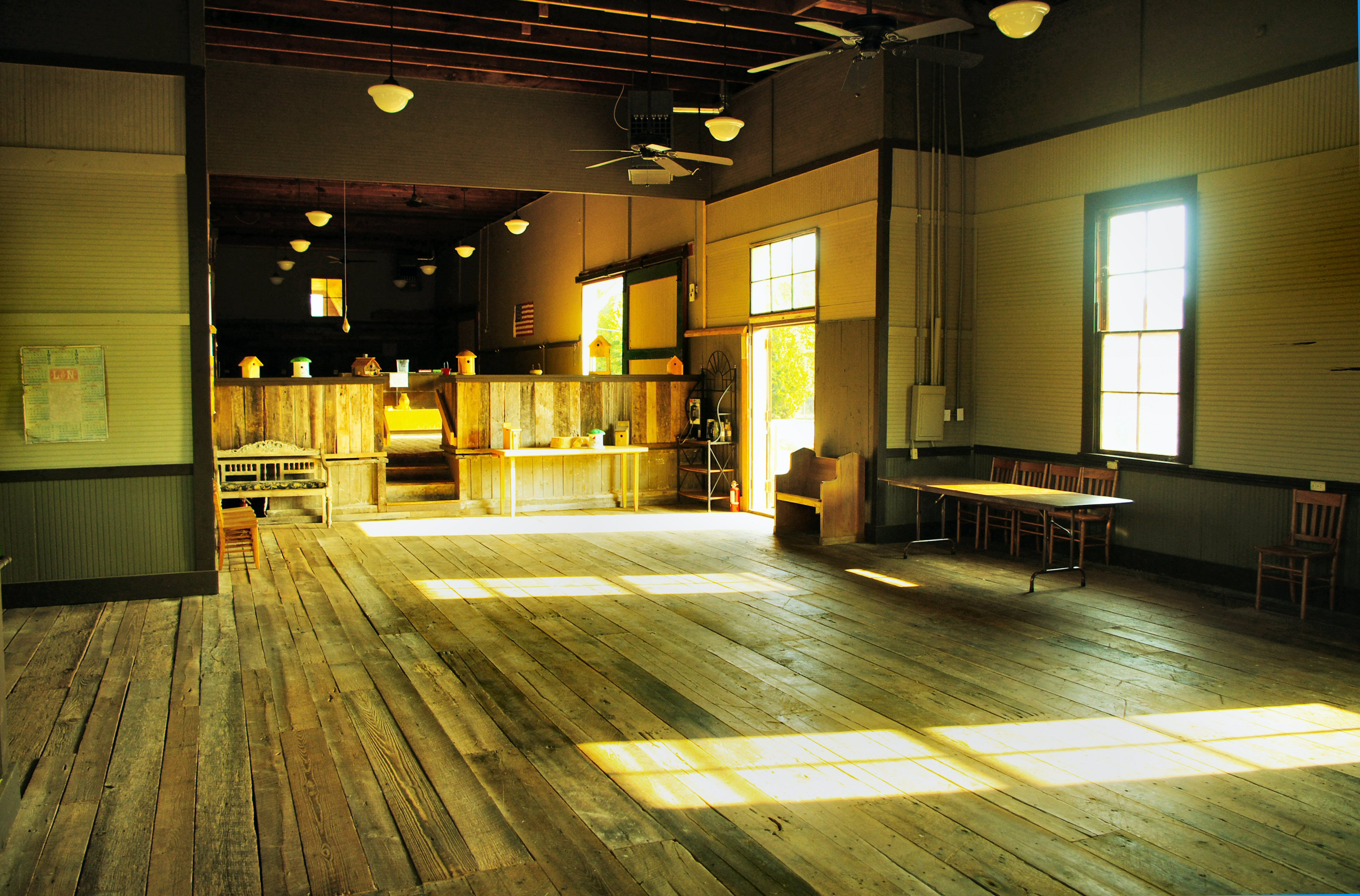
The depot's interior

The depot's interior is mostly open space, the exception being an enclosed room in the building's southeast corner (once the "colored" waiting room). The northern half of the building, which was originally the freight area, is situated at a slightly higher elevation, accessible from the main area via steps. This higher elevation was necessary to bring the freight area to the same elevation as rail cars.

The passenger area, in the southern half of the building, was originally divided into three sections: the colored waiting room in the southeast corner (still enclosed), the general waiting room in the southwest corner, and the ticket agent's office adjacent to the waiting rooms. A baggage area lay between the ticket office and the freight area. The interior has exposed rafters and pendant lights. The original slate roof was replaced with a metal roof in the 1980s, which was in turn replaced in 2012. The roof has been painted gray to match the color of the original roof.

The railroad tracks passed along the western side of the depot. The tracks are no longer present, but the grade is still easily discernible as a gravel path all the way to the Meadow community several miles to the north. The tracks continued across Morganton Road before bending southeastward toward the Jena community (where the main tracks crossed what is now Highway 95). The L&N operated a small freight yard opposite the depot between Morganton Road and Chilhowee Road, west of the Greenback Drug Store. The rail grade immediately west of the depot is included in the National Register nomination.

A small addition to the northern end of the building, constructed in 2012, contains restrooms and a changing room. A breezeway separates this addition from the rest of the building.

== History ==
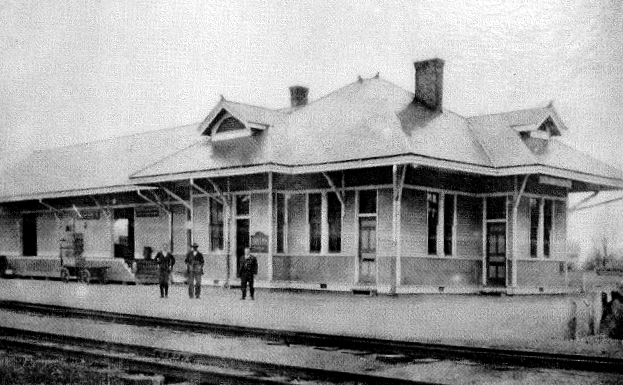
The Greenback Depot, shortly after its completion in 1914

The Knoxville Southern Railroad (not to be confused with the larger Southern Railway) began building a rail line connecting Knoxville, Tennessee, with Blue Ridge, Georgia, in the late 1880s. This line reached what is now Greenback in 1890. At the rail line's intersection with Morganton Road, developers made plans to build a town known as "Allegheny," presumably named after the Allegheny Springs resort further to the south. Lorenzo Thompson, who had established the Greenback Post Office several miles to the east in the early 1880s, moved his post office to the new town, and the town gradually adopted the name "Greenback."

In 1890, the Knoxville Southern merged with the Marietta and North Georgia Railroad. This railway was, in turn, absorbed by the Atlanta, Knoxville and Northern Railway in 1895. The Atlanta, Knoxville and Northern was purchased by the Louisville and Nashville Railroad (L&N) in 1902. For most of the latter half of the 19th century, the L&N had avoided East Tennessee due to competition from the East Tennessee, Virginia and Georgia Railroad (ETV&G), and in 1894 had made an agreement with the ETV&G's successor, the Southern Railway, not to encroach upon one another's territory. After the Southern violated this agreement, the L&N began building a rail line connecting Cincinnati and Atlanta.

The L&N's new Cincinnati-Atlanta line continued southward from Knoxville through Maryville, Vonore, and Madisonville before reaching Etowah (the tracks along this line are still used by CSX). At Mentor (just north of modern Alcoa), a side route branched off from the main line, and looped around through Louisville, Friendsville, and Greenback, before rejoining the main line at Jena (a community once located where the tracks cross modern Highway 95). In the early 1900s, the L&N constructed a number of elaborate depots along this line, including the Richard Monfort-designed L&N Station in Knoxville and the Etowah Depot in Etowah. Construction of the Greenback Depot began in 1913, and was completed the following year.

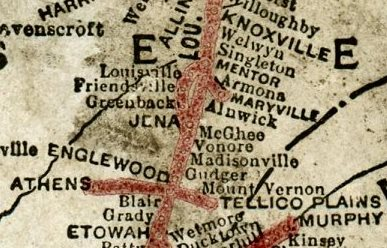
Map showing the L&N's tracks and stations in East Tennessee in 1913

William H. Jones, a Loudon County court clerk and local businessman, served as Greenback's station agent from 1910 until his death in 1954, including the entire period that the depot building was in use for its original purpose. Along with selling train tickets, Jones issued hunting, fishing and marriage licenses from his depot office. As a county official, he officiated at more than 3,500 marriage ceremonies, many of them in the depot. By the early 1950s, the L&N had ceased passenger service at Greenback, and operated only two freight lines to the city. After Jones's death in 1954, the L&N closed the depot.

The Greenback Co-Op, a local farmers' cooperative, began leasing the depot from the L&N in 1956 for fertilizer storage. To increase storage space, most of the interior walls were removed, the exception being the former colored waiting room, which was used as an office. After the L&N merged with the Seaboard Coast Line in 1982, the new company sold the depot. Two local residents, Bobby and Linda Tarwater, operated an antique store in the depot from 1983 to 1984. After Bobby Tarwater's death, the depot was sold to Supra Sports, a local boat manufacturer, which used it for offices. Supra sold the depot to George Fowler in 1989, and Fowler sold it to Larry and Mary Alley in 1999.

After searching for several years for a preservation-minded buyer, the Alleys sold the depot to Ron Edmondson in March 2012. Edmondson removed a false second story (which had been added by Supra for office space), replaced the roof, and painted the building in a manner that resembles its early 20th-century appearance. A wooden statue of the Cherokee leader Firekiller, carved by Townsend-based chainsaw artist Dave LaVoie, has been placed on the depot lot.

Preceding station	Louisville and Nashville Railroad	Following station
Friendsville toward Cincinnati	Cincinnati – Atlanta	Jena toward Atlanta

== See also ==
- National Register of Historic Places listings in Loudon County, Tennessee
