= Lenoir Cotton Mill =

- Formerly listed on the U.S. National Register of Historic Places
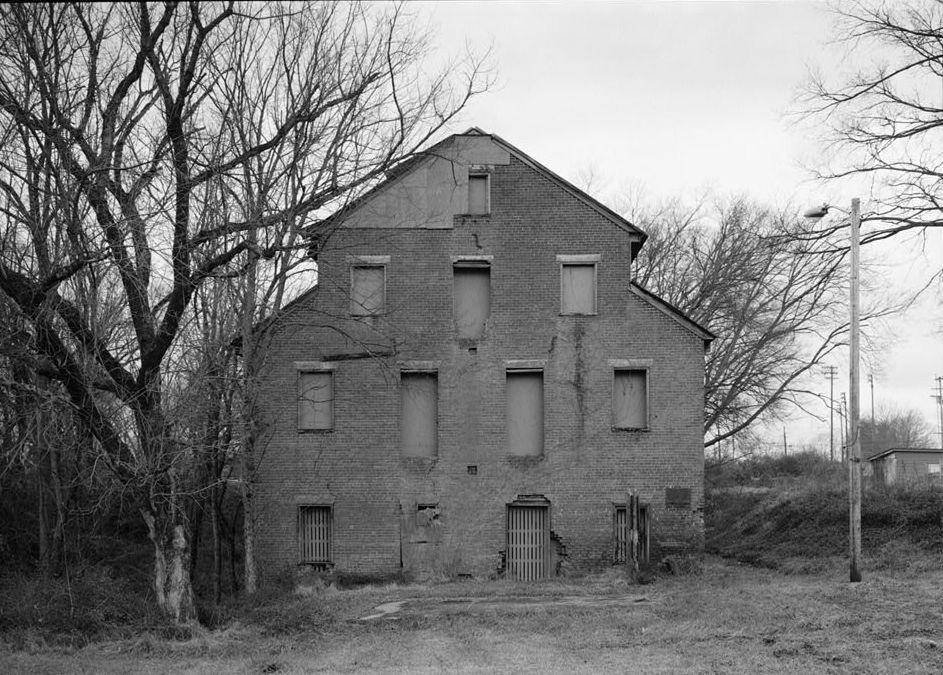
- Lenoir Cotton Mill in 1983

- Location within Tennessee Location within the United States
- Location: Depot Street, Lenoir City, Tennessee
- Coordinates: 35°47′27″N 84°15′47″W
- Built: circa 1830
- NRHP reference No.: 75001767

Significant dates
- Added to NRHP: 1973
- Removed from NRHP: July 30, 2002

The Lenoir Cotton Mill was a 19th-century cotton mill located in the U.S. city of Lenoir City, Tennessee. One of the earliest examples of industrial architecture in Tennessee, the mill operated variously from its construction around 1830 until the 1950s. The mill was documented by the Historic American Buildings Survey and placed on the National Register of Historic Places in the 1970s. Efforts to restore the mill began in 1980, but before the restoration could be completed, the mill was destroyed by arson in 1991.

The Lenoir Cotton Mill was one of several enterprises established by early settler and entrepreneur William Ballard Lenoir (1775–1852). Lenoir moved to the area in 1810 after his father, General William Lenoir, deeded to him the 5,000-acre (2,000 ha) tract of land comprising what is now Lenoir City. The younger Lenoir established the Lenoir Manufacturing Company in 1817, which engaged in multiple agricultural and industrial enterprises throughout the 19th century. The cotton mill was completed in the early 1830s and gradually expanded in subsequent decades. During the U.S. Civil War, Union soldiers destroyed parts of the estate of the Confederate-leaning Lenoir family, but spared the mill due to William Ballard Lenoir's son Benjamin's Mason affiliations. After the Lenoir family sold the mill in the 1890s, it operated variously as a hosiery mill and later as a flour mill.

== Location ==
The Lenoir Cotton Mill site is located near the corner of Depot Street and South Hill Street, just off U.S. Route 11 in downtown Lenoir City. Town Creek, which flows along the eastern base of the mill site, empties into the Tennessee River about a half-mile to the south. The William Ballard Lenoir house, built in 1821, still stands across the street from the mill site, although it has been drastically modified as a residential apartment complex. Another structure related to the mill, the Lenoir Cotton Mill Warehouse, stands about a half-mile to the southeast, and has recently been restored and currently serves as a residence.

== History ==
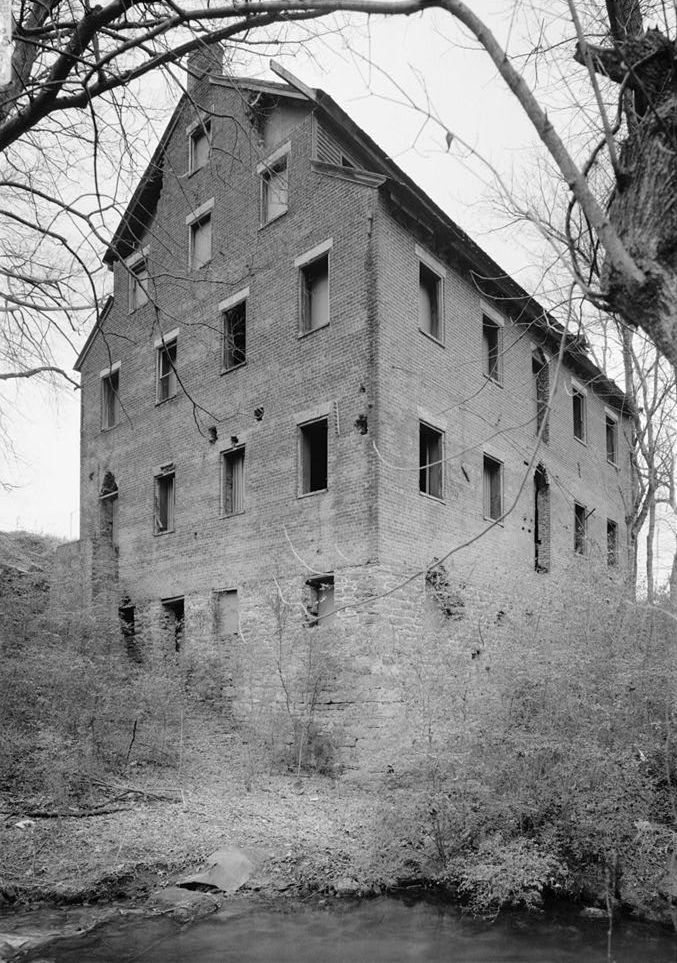
The Lenoir Cotton Mill, rising above Town Creek

What is now Lenoir City was originally part of a 5,000-acre (2,000 ha) grant of land given to General William Lenoir (1751–1839) for service in the American Revolution. Lenoir deeded the land to his son, William Ballard Lenoir, who moved his family to the area in 1810. William Ballard Lenoir established the Lenoir Manufacturing Company in 1817, and engaged in numerous agricultural and industrial endeavors. Along with the cotton mill, Lenoir built a sawmill and gristmill on Town Creek, and raised livestock. The Lenoir family used both slave labor and paid labor in their enterprises.

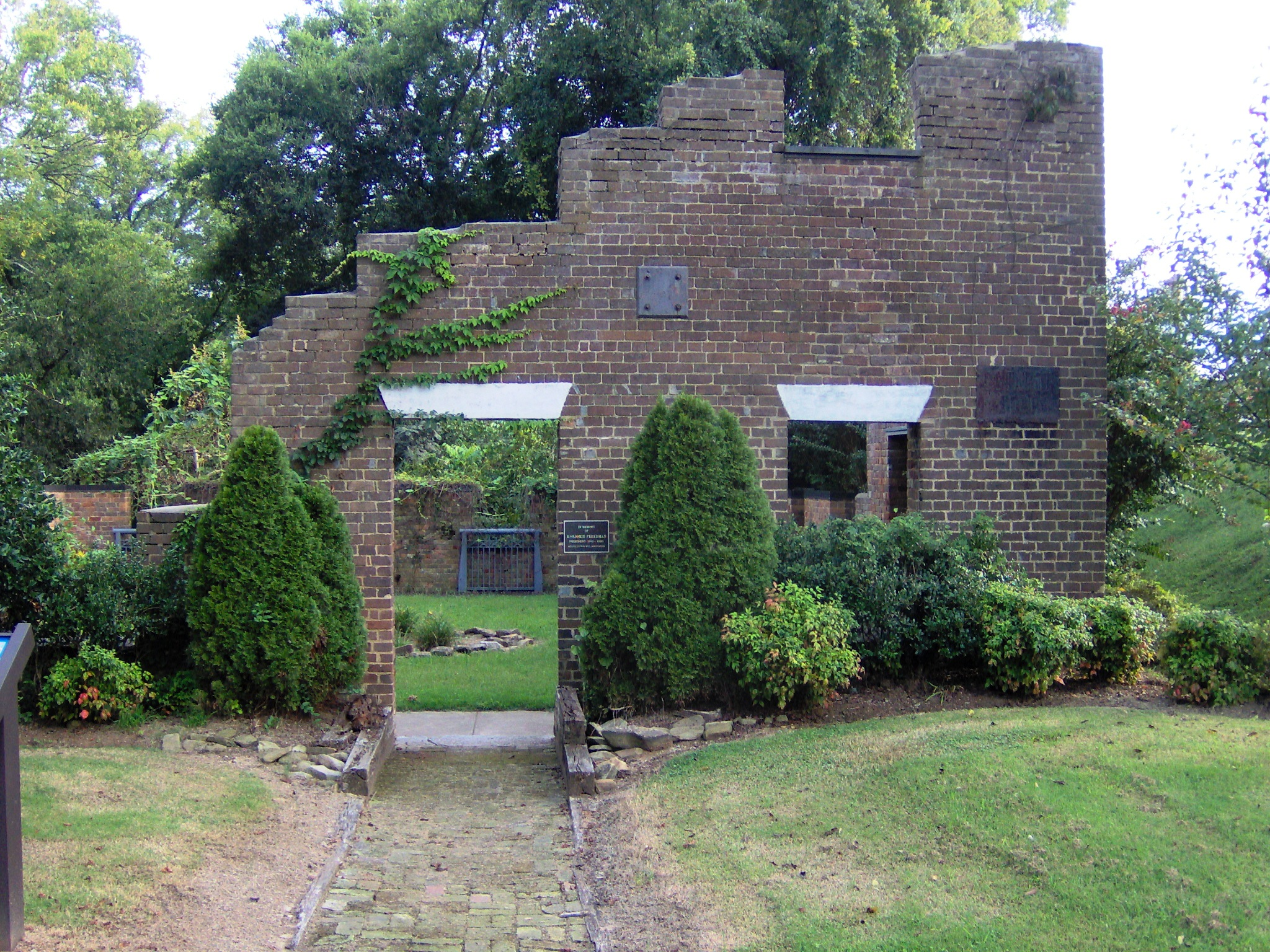
The ruins of the Lenoir Cotton Mill, now part of a city park

The cotton mill was completed in the early 1830s. A Pittsburgh miller named E.F. Faber built a 113-spindle spinning jack and three looms for Lenoir's mill in 1831. Lenoir's farm grew and ginned its own cotton throughout the 1830s, but eventually Lenoir employed his sons to purchase raw cotton for the mill. By the mid-1850s, the mill had 620 spindles, and was powered by an overshot waterwheel. In 1855, the mill's value was listed at $12,000, making it the Lenoirs' most valuable asset.

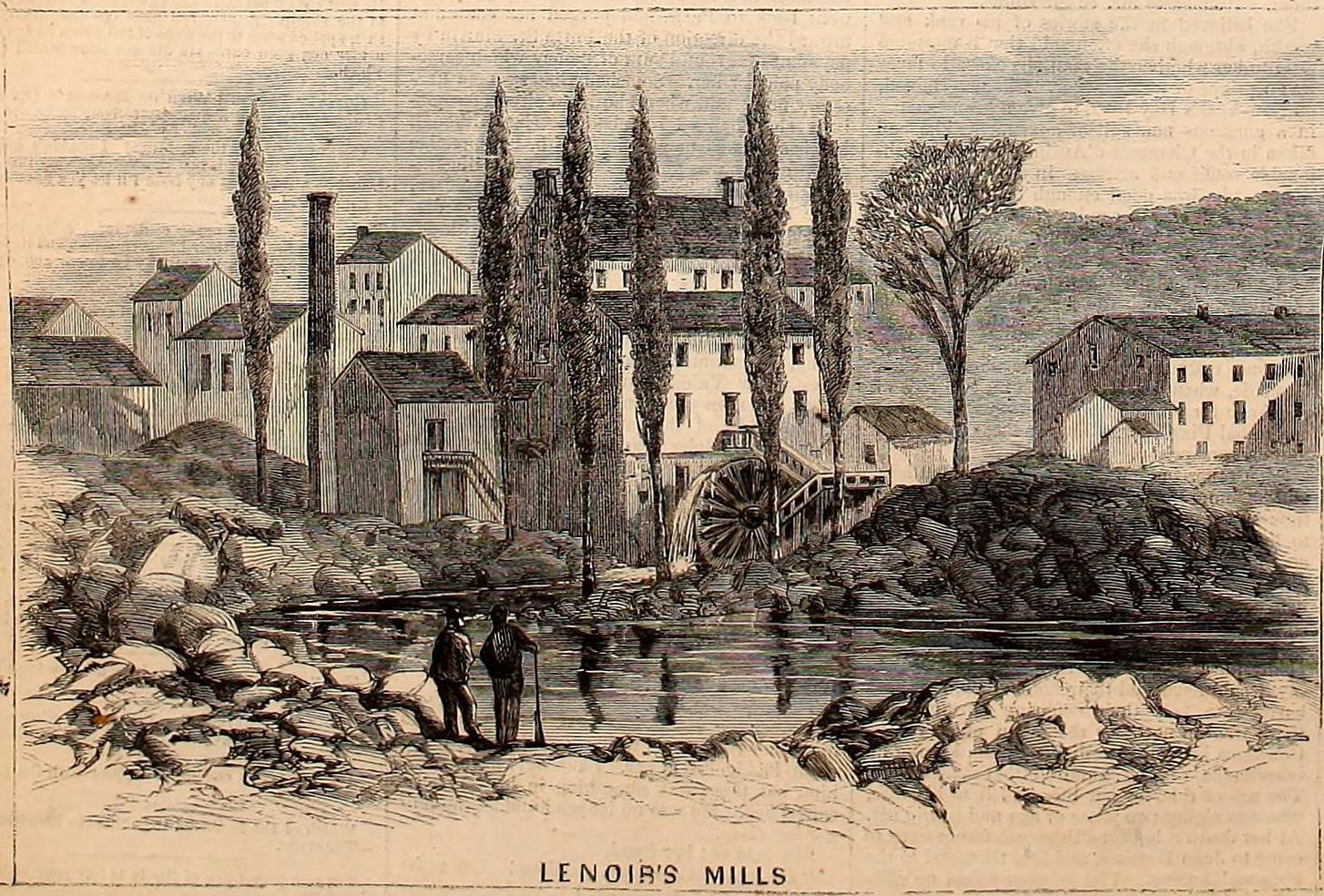
The mills in 1864

After Lenoir's death in 1852, his sons continued operating the mill. During the Civil War (1861–1865), the Lenoirs supported the Confederacy, and when Union soldiers occupied the Lenoir estate in 1863, they burned the Lenoirs' railroad depot, general store, and several other outbuildings. As they prepared to burn the cotton mill, William Ballard Lenoir's son, Benjamin Ballard Lenoir, walked through the ranks of the Union troops flashing a secret Masonic sign, and the troops spared the mill.

By 1890, when the Lenoir City Company purchased the Lenoir estate, the mill had been expanded to include over 1,000 spindles. The Holston Manufacturing Company used the mill for a hosiery operation in the 1890s, although the mill was eventually converted into a flour mill, which operated until the 1950s. In 1980, the Lenoir Cotton Mill Association was formed to preserve the mill, and eventually raised over $100,000 for its restoration. The mill was destroyed by arson in 1991, however, and in 1996 Lenoir City rejected a plan to rebuild the mill, choosing instead to include the mill's ruins in plans for a city park. One of the mill's warehouses, known as the Lenoir Cotton Mill Warehouse, was restored and placed on the National Register of Historic Places in 2006.

== See also ==
- Blair's Ferry Storehouse
