= William Ballard Lenoir =

American businessman and politician

William Ballard Lenoir (1775–1852; also given as 1781-1855) was known as a businessman and politician in what is now known as Lenoir City, Tennessee, where he moved in the early nineteenth century. He had served in the militia and reached the rank of major. Lenoir founded mills along the Tennessee River, including one to process and weave cotton produced in the region. He and his father General William Lenoir, who had originally been granted the land tract, were both namesakes of the town.

== Biography ==
William Ballard Lenoir was the eldest son of General William Lenoir and his wife, Ann Ballard. Born and raised in North Carolina, the younger Lenoir married Elizabeth Avery (daughter of Waightstill Avery and his wife.)) In 1810 they moved to a tract of land in Tennessee on the Tennessee River. Modern-day Lenoir City developed here, named both the father and son. His father, General Lenoir, had been granted the land by the state of North Carolina (which then claimed it under its colonial charter) for service in the Revolutionary War.

William B. Lenoir became active in business and in Tennessee politics. He was elected and served one term in the state House of Representatives from 1815 to 1817. He established the Lenoir Manufacturing Company in 1817, and built several mills on the Tennessee River in what is now Lenoir City, including the Lenoir Cotton Mill. His son, Isaac, followed him into politics, and was elected to serve terms in each house of the Tennessee legislature.
