= Blair's Ferry Storehouse =

- U.S. National Register of Historic Places
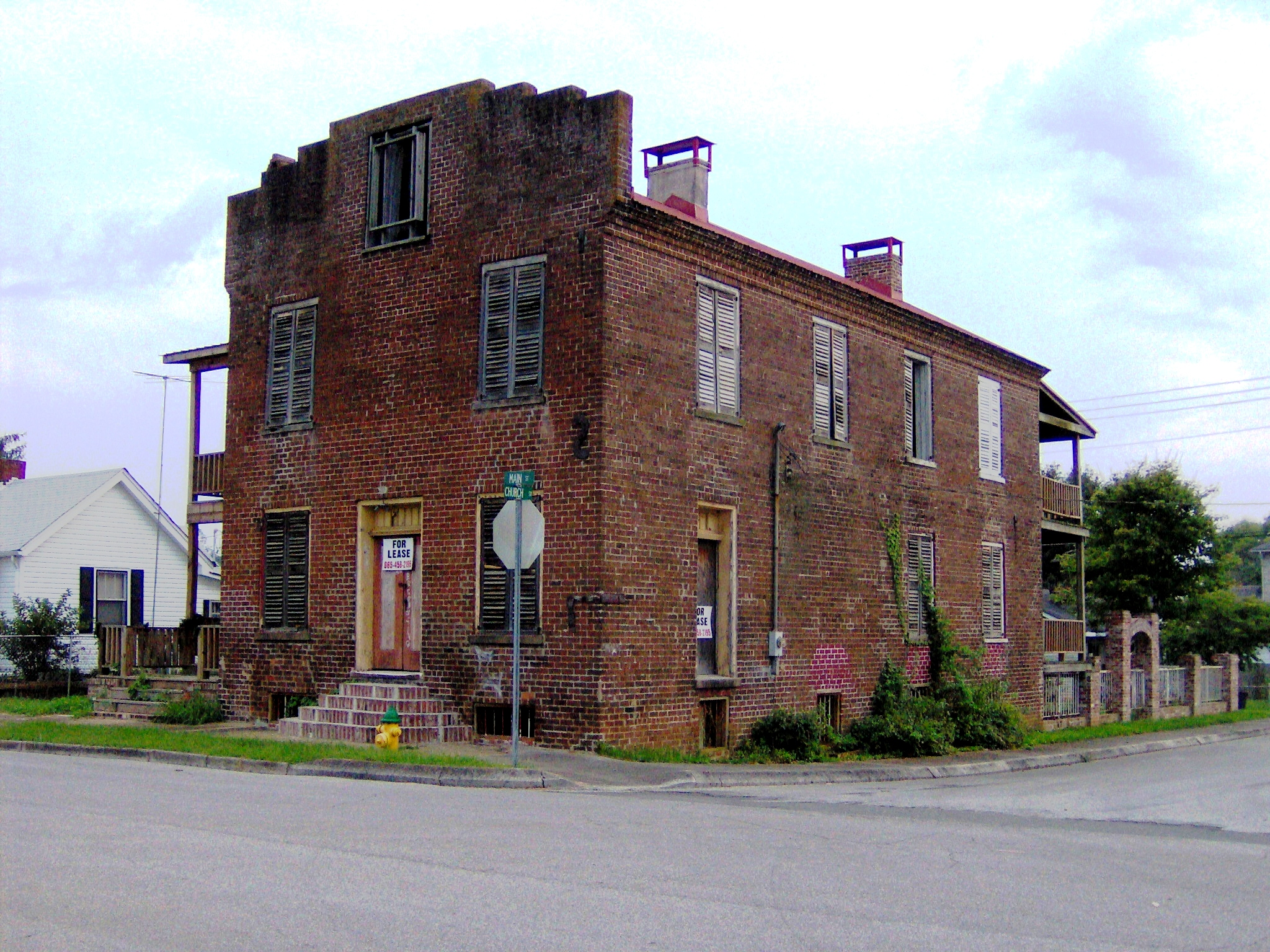
- Blair's Ferry Storehouse - front facade

- Location within Tennessee Location within the United States
- Location: 800 Main St.
- Nearest city: Loudon, Tennessee
- Coordinates: 35°44′27″N 84°20′0″W
- Area: .5 acres (0.20 ha)
- Built: circa 1835
- NRHP reference No.: 77001277
- Added to NRHP: July 14, 1977

The Blair's Ferry Storehouse is a historic brick structure in the U.S. city of Loudon, Tennessee. Originally built as a storehouse for the burgeoning riverboat trade in the community of Blair's Ferry in the 1830s, the structure was eventually renovated and used for a variety of functions throughout the 19th and 20th centuries. The building is one of the region's earliest surviving examples of a structure designed specifically as a warehouse. In 1977, the building was placed on the National Register of Historic Places.

== Location ==
The Blair's Ferry Storehouse is located at the corner of Main Street and Church Street, just off U.S. Route 11 in downtown Loudon. The storehouse overlooks the west bank of the Tennessee River, at River Mile 592, with a large factory dominating the view on the opposite side of the river. The storehouse is visible from the Veterans Memorial Bridge, which crosses the river immediately downstream. Blair's Ferry Storehouse should not be confused with the Orme Wilson Storehouse, a mid-19th-century structure currently occupied by the Wharf Street Coffeehouse.

== History ==
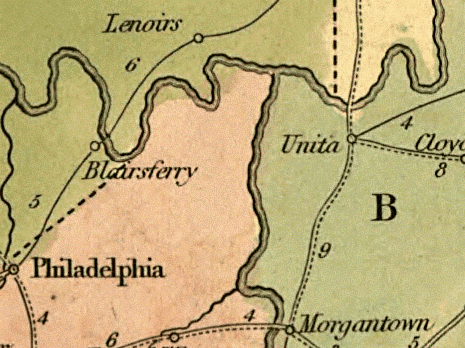
1839 map of what is now Loudon County, showing the location of Blair's Ferry

The Blair family was one of the first families to settle at what is now Loudon, arriving sometime in the 1790s. James Blair (1777–1826)—whose brother-in-law John Hudson Carmichael had established the Carmichael Inn in 1810—was granted permission to operate a ferry along the river in 1817. The small community that grew up around the ferry thus became known as "Blair's Ferry." The community grew slowly, for while it was in a location well-suited for river traffic, most river trade was local, since various river obstacles (such as Muscle Shoals) isolated the Upper Tennessee River from the great ports along the Mississippi River for all but a few months each year. In 1830, the state government funded dredging projects that made the river navigable from Knoxville to Decatur, Alabama (at the head of Muscle Shoals), bringing increased river traffic to Blair's Ferry.

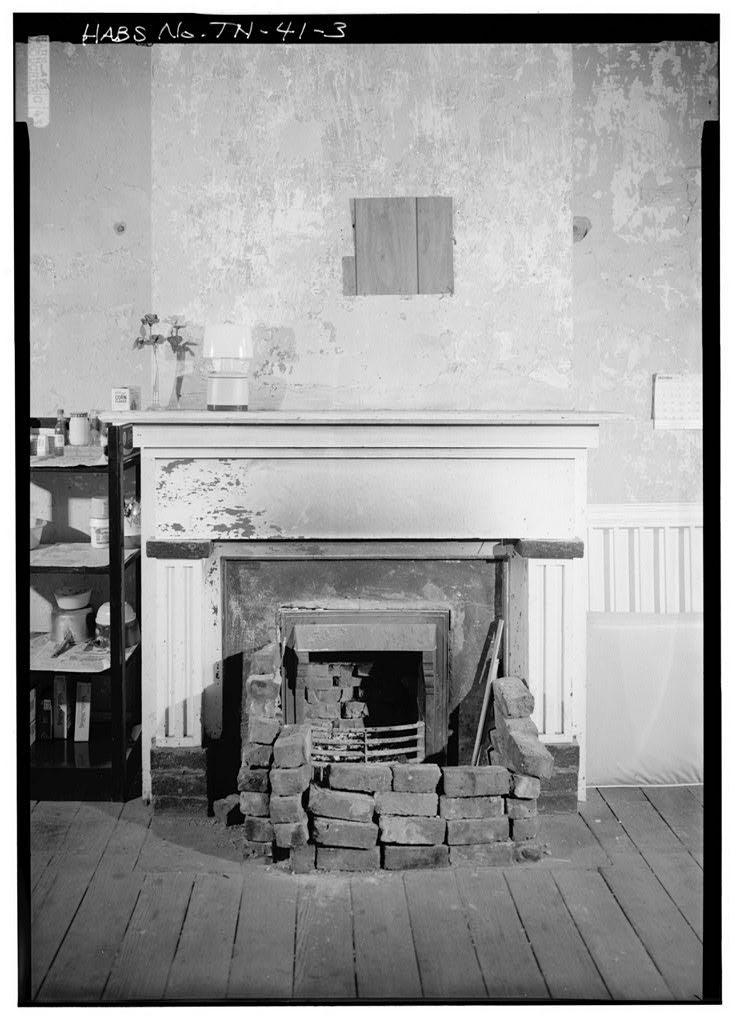
Fireplace inside the Blair's Ferry Storehouse

Throughout the 1820s and early 1830s, Blair's Ferry was the subject of a lengthy court case. In 1819, taking advantage of a provision in the Calhoun Treaty, the Cherokee leader Pathkiller claimed a 640-acre (260 ha) reservation of land that included Blair's Ferry. Blair sued Pathkiller to regain title to the land. Although Blair died in 1826 and Pathkiller died the following year, Blair's sons John and Wiley continued to pursue the case against the Gardenhire family, to whom Pathkiller had sold the reservation. In 1834, the court ruled that Pathkiller's sale of the land had made his reservation claim null and void, and title to the land was returned to the Blairs. The Blair's Ferry Storehouse was constructed shortly after this legal victory to take advantage of the growing river trade. The storehouse's builder is unknown, but some sources suggest a local entrepreneur named James H. Johnston (an associate of the Blairs), who operated a general store at the storehouse until the 1860s.

In the 1840s, Blair's Ferry had a general store, steamboat landing, and several houses, along with the ferry. The community changed its name to "Blairsville" in 1851, and the following year, the East Tennessee and Georgia Railroad constructed a line connecting Blairsville with Dalton, Georgia. The company intended to connect Dalton with Knoxville, but struggled to raise funding to build a bridge across the Tennessee River, and thus Blairsville became the railroad's temporary northern terminus. With the help of railroad planners, Blairsville expanded, and was renamed "Loudon" after the nearby colonial Fort Loudoun. In the years 1852 to 1855 (when the bridge was completed), Loudon experienced a boom period, with farmers arriving from around the region to ship their crops to the south.

After the U.S. Civil War, the Blair's Ferry Storehouse came into the possession of a local merchant named John West, who continued to use it as a general store. After West's death in 1883, the storehouse changed hands several times over subsequent decades. It was variously used as a dance hall, packing house, and as a temporary church. In the early 1900s, the second story was partitioned and modified for use as residential apartments. A grocer named W.B. Arp purchased the storehouse in the 1930s, and while he used the storehouse for a grocery store, he continued renting out the second story as a residence. Arp added the rear and side porches, and converted the basement into a residential apartment. A grocery store operated out of the first floor of the storehouse until the 1980s.

== Design ==
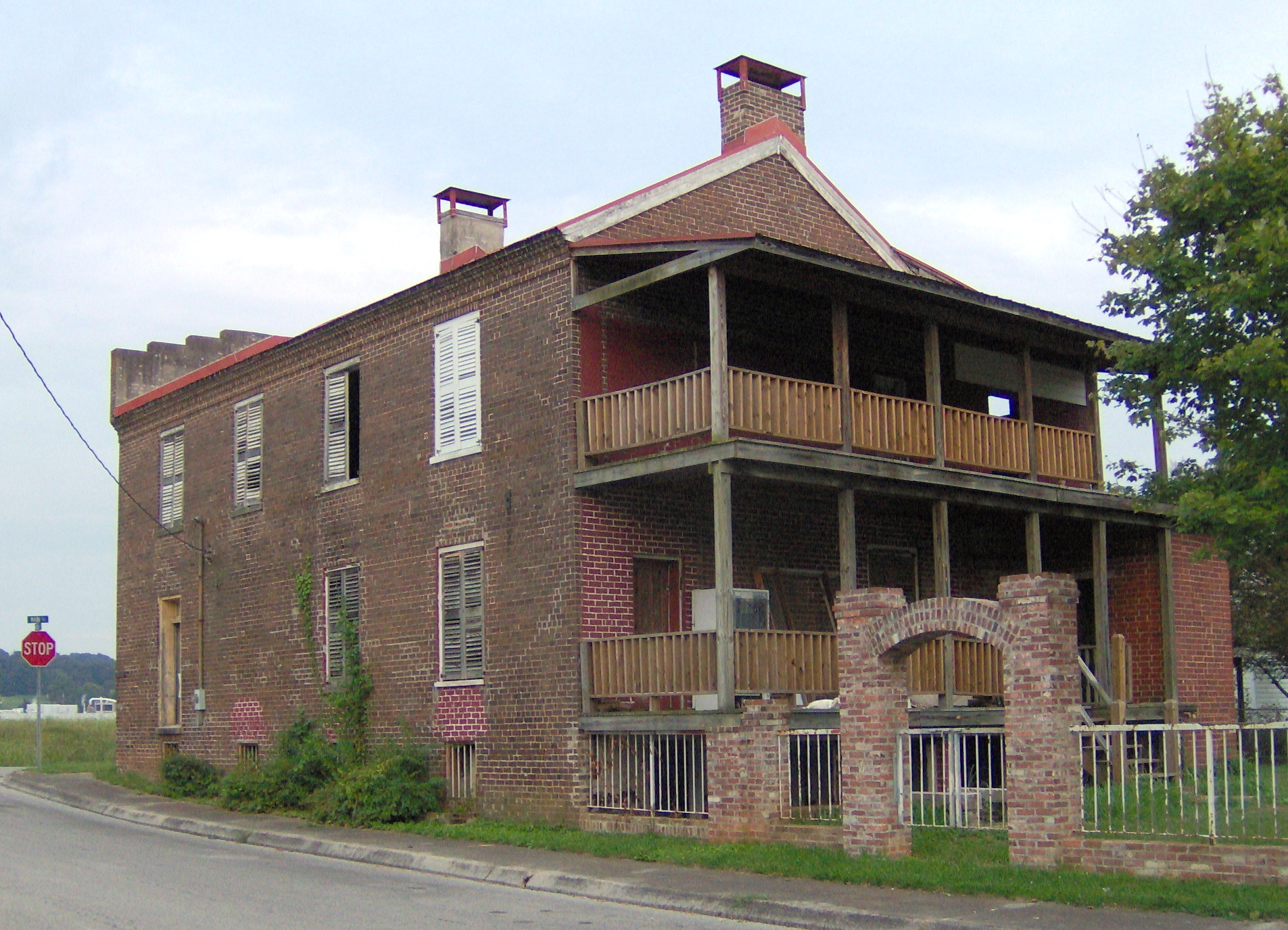
Rear view, showing 20th-century porch additions

The Blair's Ferry Storehouse is a Federal-style two-story building with a stepped brick facade and gable roof. The building was originally rectangular, measuring 25 feet (7.6 m) by 58 feet (18 m) (including the porch in the back), although a 16-foot (4.9 m) wing addition to the south wall in the 1930s gave the building an "L" shape. The bricks of the original structure are handmade bricks laid in common bond, while the bricks of the later additions are pressed bricks. The floors of the first and second stories consist of wooden planks, while the basement floor is poured concrete. The building has two porches— a two-story, shed-roofed porch along the rear (west) wall, and a similar two-story porch along the south wall.

The first floor of the interior contains a storeroom (at the east, or front end), a parlor, and a kitchen. The second story contains two bedrooms, a parlor, and a dining room. The basement contains an apartment similar to the one on the second story. There are no interior stairways, so the second story is accessible only via the side and rear porches, and the basement is accessible through a door adjacent to the rear porch.

== See also ==
- Lenoir Cotton Mill
