= William H. Griffitts House =

Historic house in Tennessee, United States

- U.S. National Register of Historic Places
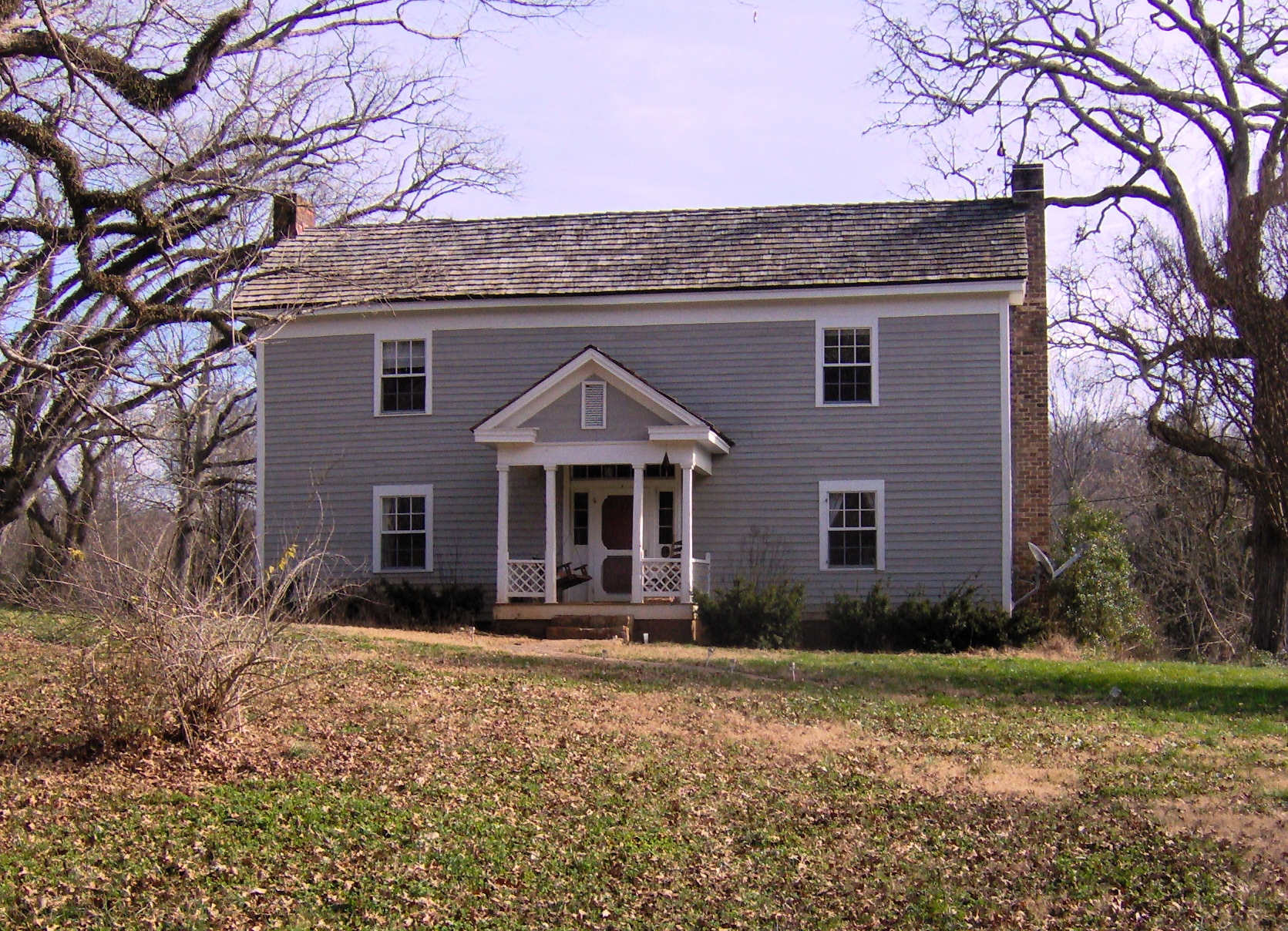

- Location within Tennessee Location within the United States
- Nearest city: Greenback, Tennessee
- Coordinates: 35°40′25″N 84°13′39″W
- Area: 10.5 acres (4.2 ha)
- Built: 1854
- Architectural style: East Tennessee vernacular
- NRHP reference No.: 89000141
- Added to NRHP: March 2, 1989

The William H. Griffitts House is a historic farmhouse on Jackson Ferry Road in Loudon County, Tennessee, United States, northwest of Greenback and near the edge of Tellico Lake. It is listed on the National Register of Historic Places.

== Description ==
The house, which was completed in 1854 (when its site was part of Blount County, Tennessee), is a two-story wooden frame farmhouse with nine rooms arranged in an ell-shaped layout. It is a vernacular design that exhibits Federal influences in its three-bay front facade and pedimented front entrance. The house has five fireplaces.

== History ==
The owner of the house, William H. Griffitts, was born in 1825 into one of the Quaker families that had arrived in Blount County around 1800 and settled in the Unitia and Friendsville areas. He and his wife, Lucy Ann Burton, were the parents of seven children.

With other Quakers in the local area, the Griffitts family were active supporters of the Underground Railroad movement that aided fugitive African-American slaves attempting to reach freedom in the northern United States. Historians identify the Griffitts house and the nearby Friendsville and Unitia communities as "stations" on the Underground Railroad. During the American Civil War, they also sheltered white Southern men seeking to avoid military conscription by the Confederacy.

During the Civil War, William Griffitts had conscientious objector status due to his Quaker religious faith. In lieu of military service, he worked in a salt mine in Kentucky. His wife and teenaged son managed the farm and household during his absence. After the war, the Griffitts family allowed former slaves to live on a portion of their property that is still known locally as Negro Hollow.

The property remained in the Griffitts family until 1960, and Griffitts descendants lived in the house until 1943. It was listed on the National Register of Historic Places in 1989 as the result of efforts by Larry Benson, who purchased it in 1978 and did extensive restoration and renovation work. Architect Eugene Burr drafted the National Register nomination materials.
