= William Lenoir (general) =

American Revolutionary war officer and politician (1751-1839)

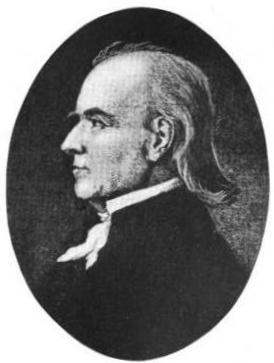

Speaker of the North Carolina Senate
- In office 1790–1795
- Preceded by: Charles Johnson
- Succeeded by: Benjamin Smith

Personal details
- Born: May 8, 1751 Brunswick County, Colony of Virginia
- Died: May 6, 1839 (aged 87) Fort Defiance, Caldwell County, North Carolina
- Resting place: Fort Defiance Cemetery; Lenoir, North Carolina
- Spouse: Ann Ballard
- Relations: William Ballard Lenoir (son); Israel Pickens (son-in-law)

Military service
- Allegiance: United States
- Branch/service: Colonial and state militias
- Years of service: 1775–1812
- Rank: Major General
- Unit: Surry County Regiment (1776-1777), Wilkes County Regiment (1777-1781)
- Commands: Fifth North Carolina Division
- Battles/wars: Battle of Stono Ferry, Siege of Savannah, Battle of Kings Mountain, Haw River

William Lenoir (May 8, 1751 – May 6, 1839) was an American Revolutionary War officer and prominent statesman in late 18th-century and early 19th-century North Carolina. Both Lenoir, North Carolina, and Lenoir County, North Carolina, are named for him. Additionally, Lenoir City, Tennessee, is jointly named for him and for his son, William Ballard Lenoir. The USS Lenoir (AKA-74) was indirectly named for him.

== Family and early years ==
The Lenoir name is of French origin, literally translating to "the black," which was a term that was similar to how the word "dark" is now used to speak of someone with dark hair and complexion. Lenoirs came to the English colonies in America from Brittany as a result of 17th century religious troubles. Brittany was just across the English Channel from southern England. Because it had such a long coastline, it is no surprise how many mariners came from the area. The Lenoir coat-of-arms, "Le Noir de Nantes" is named for Nantes, the largest city of Brittany and an important seaport.

William Lenoir was born the youngest of ten in a French Huguenot family in Brunswick County, Virginia. His mother was Mourning Crawley, the daughter of a well-to-do Virginia planter. Her grandfather was Robert Crawley who was an early vestryman of the most noted surviving colonial church, Bruton Parish in Williamsburg. Lenoir's father was Thomas Lenoir, who, like his own father, was a mariner in early life before his marriage when he became a tobacco planter for the remainder of his life. The family moved to eastern North Carolina when William was nine years old, which was where his father died in 1765. Of the four daughters, Ann, Betty, Leah, and Mary; Leah lived the longest, marrying John Norwood and dying in North Carolina at age 94. One of the six sons of Thomas and Mourning died unmarried, Robert remained in Virginia, Thomas Jr., Isaac and John settled in South Carolina, and William remained in North Carolina, where he went on to have a distinguished public career and founded the Fort Defiance branch of the family.

Lenoir had no formal education but could read and write Latin, Greek, and French. His first occupation was that of teacher and schoolmaster, before he became a surveyor. While surveying in western North Carolina, Lenoir decided to permanently settle there. He brought with him his wife, Ann Ballard, and a baby daughter, when he arrived in March 1775. The Lenoirs had nine children in all. Their daughter Martha ("Patsy") married Israel Pickens.

== Revolutionary War ==
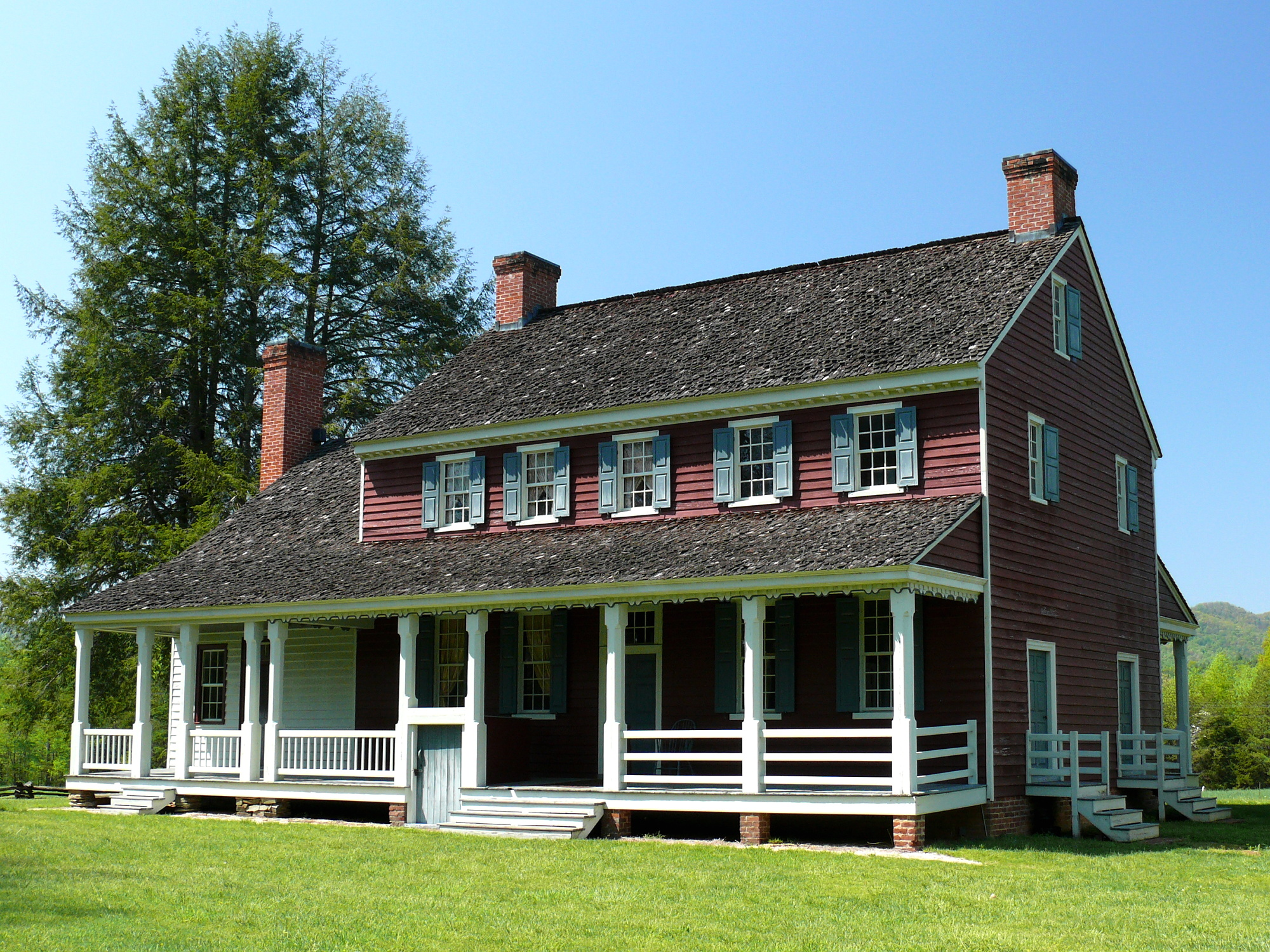
Fort Defiance

Historian Samuel Ashe called Lenoir an "active and zealous and efficient supporter of the cause of independence." He served with distinction in the American Revolutionary War, in particular taking part in the Battle of Kings Mountain as a captain in the Wilkes County Regiment of the North Carolina militia under Benjamin Cleveland. He received minor wounds at that battle. While serving as a major of a company of the Wilkes County Regiment, he fought at the Battle of Stono Ferry, the Siege of Savannah, and at Pyle's Massacre (during which his horse was said to be the only American Patriot casualty). Lenoir subsequently gathered troops together to fight at the Battle of Guilford Court House, but they arrived too late. He was also involved in minor skirmishes with Loyalists and Cherokee Indians.

After the war, William and his wife, Ann, lived in their home, called Fort Defiance (built by Thomas Fields). Only years after the war did Lenoir achieve the rank of major general from service in the state militia. Shortly after achieving that rank, he desired to fight in the War of 1812 but was deemed too old to do so. The disappointment of that led Lenoir to resign from the militia. Fort Defiance continues today, restored as a tourist and historical attraction in Caldwell County, North Carolina.

== Politics and public service ==
Lenoir, an anti-federalist, served for many years as a justice of the peace and Clerk of Court for Wilkes County, North Carolina. He was a founding member (and briefly, the first president) of the Board of Trustees of the University of North Carolina at Chapel Hill, where Lenoir Hall is named for him.

From 1781 to 1795, Lenoir was also a member of the state Legislature representing Wilkes County and served as Speaker of the North Carolina Senate from 1790 to 1795. He was a member of both the Hillsborough Convention of 1788, which neither rejected nor approved the United States Constitution, and the Fayetteville Convention of 1789, which ratified it. Lenoir was suspicious of the constitution and argued that it needed an amendment guaranteeing religious freedom (which it later received). Lenoir was the runner-up in the 1792 North Carolina gubernatorial election, despite withdrawing his name from consideration, and unsuccessfully ran for the 12th congressional district in 1802 and 1806, finishing third in the former and losing to Meshack Franklin in the latter.

== Death and legacy ==
Lenoir died on May 6, 1839, two days shy of his eighty-eighth birthday. His epitaph, written by Governor David Swain, read in part, "A genuine Whig whose highest eulogy is the record of his deeds." Both Lenoir, North Carolina, and Lenoir County, North Carolina, are named for him. Additionally, Lenoir City, Tennessee, is jointly named for him and for his son, William Ballard Lenoir. The USS Lenoir (AKA-74) was indirectly named for him.

== Notes and references ==
- Connor, R.D.D. (1913). A Manual of North Carolina (PDF). Raleigh: North Carolina Historical Commission.
- "The Legislative Manual and Political Register of the State of North Carolina". 1874.
