= Lenoir City, Tennessee =

- City
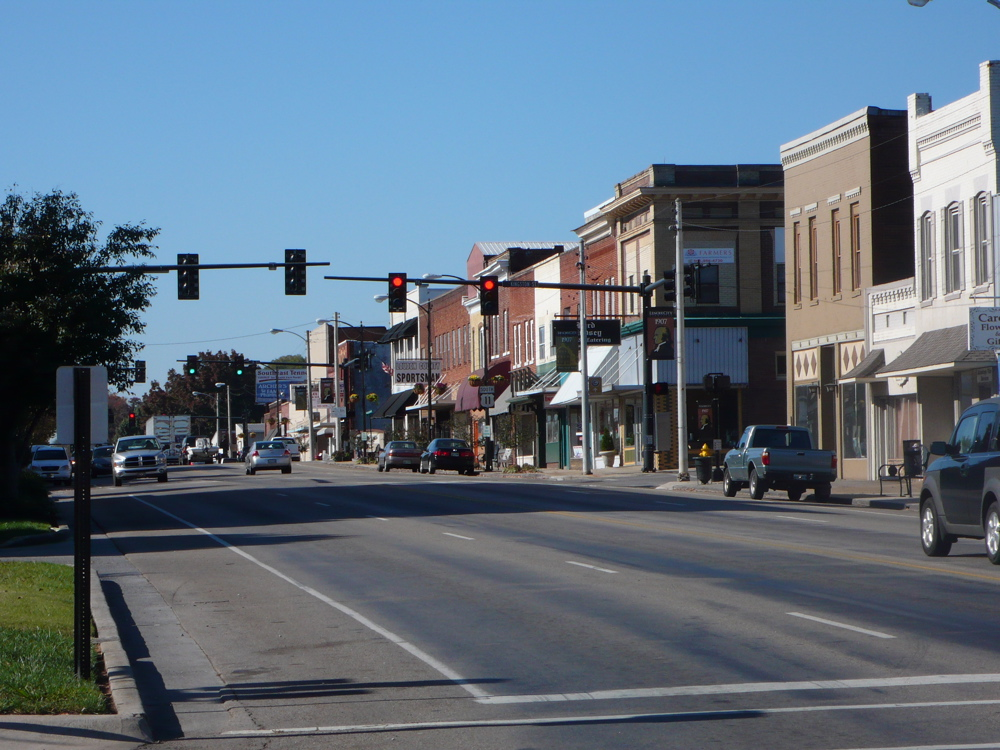
- US Route 11 passing through downtown Lenoir City, Tennessee.
- Nickname: Lakeway to the Smokies
- Location of Lenoir City in Loudon County, Tennessee.
- Coordinates: 35°48′43″N 84°16′59″W
- Country: United States
- State: Tennessee
- Counties: Loudon, Roane
- Settled: 1810
- Founded: 1840
- Incorporated: 1907
- Named after: William Lenoir and William Ballard Lenoir

Government
  - Type: Mayor-council-administrator
  - Mayor: Tony R. Aikens
  - Vice Mayor: Jennifer Wampler
  - City Administrator: Amber Scott
  - City Council: Council members: Mike Henline; Douglas "Buddy" Hines; Jim Shields; Eddie Simpson; Jennifer Wampler
  - Police Chief: Don White
  - Fire Chief: Richard Martin

Area
  - Total: 8.63 sq mi (22.34 km^{2})
  - Land: 8.63 sq mi (22.34 km^{2})
  - Water: 0 sq mi (0.00 km^{2})
- Elevation: 856 ft (261 m)

Population (2020)
  - Total: 10,117
  - Density: 1,172.9/sq mi (452.84/km^{2})
- Time zone: UTC-5 (Eastern (EST))
  - Summer (DST): UTC-4 (EDT)
- ZIP codes: 37771-37772
- Area code: 865
- FIPS code: 47-41760
- GNIS feature ID: 2404912
- Website: www.lenoircitytn.gov

Lenoir City is a suburban city located primarily in Loudon County, Tennessee, with a small portion extending into neighboring Roane County, Tennessee. The population was 10,117 at the 2020 census. It is included in the Knoxville metropolitan area in East Tennessee, along the Tennessee River southwest of Knoxville.

== History ==
Native Americans were living in the Lenoir City area for thousands of years before the arrival of the first European settlers. On Bussell Island, which lies across the Tennessee River to the south, archaeologists have discovered evidence of habitation dating to as early as the Archaic Period (8000–1000 B.C.). The island is also believed to have been the location of "Coste", a village visited by Spanish explorer Hernando de Soto in 1540.

The Cherokee called the Lenoir City area Wa'ginsi and believed it to be the home of a large serpent that brought bad luck to anyone who saw it. By the early 19th century, an early East Tennessee pioneer, Judge David Campbell, had laid claim to part of what is now Lenoir City, where he built a log cabin and a gristmill.

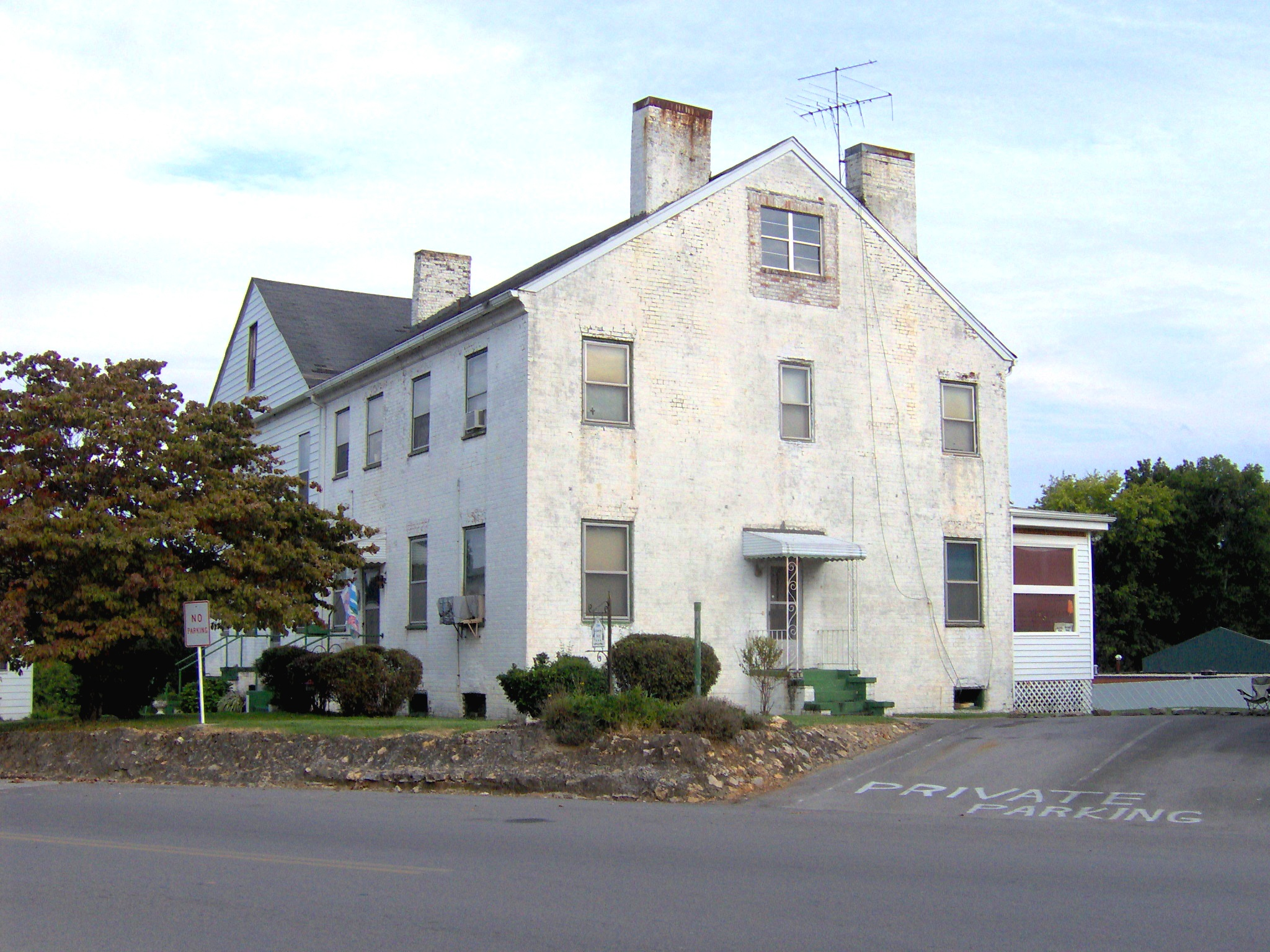
The William Ballard Lenoir House, built in 1821, now part of the Ledbetter Apartments

In the early 19th century, the state of North Carolina granted General William Lenoir a 5,000-acre (2,000 ha) tract of land—which included what developed as Lenoir City—as payment for his services in the American Revolutionary War. David Campbell and another early settler, Alexander Outlaw, filed a case against Lenoir in court, arguing they had already laid claim to parts of the Lenoir tract. After the case was settled in favor of Lenoir in 1809, Lenoir deeded the tract to his eldest son, William Ballard Lenoir. In 1810 the younger Lenoir moved to the tract with his wife and established a large plantation. His workforce was composed of enslaved African Americans. Lenoir's agricultural enterprise included producing hams from a herd of Berkshire hogs. He also developed several small-scale industries, including a sawmill and flour mill. In the early 1830s, he built the Lenoir Cotton Mill—one of the earliest in the South—sited along the banks of Town Creek, a tributary of the Tennessee River.

After Lenoir's death, his estate was divided among his children. His sons formed the William Lenoir and Brothers Company to manage the family's businesses. When the railroad reached the Lenoir plantation in 1855, a depot was constructed. The community of Lenoir Station developed around it.

During the Civil War, the Lenoirs supported the Confederacy, due in part to associations with Confederate-leaning business interests in Knoxville. (One of Lenoir's sons was married to the daughter of J. G. M. Ramsey, a Knoxville historian and banker, and an ardent Confederate). On June 20, 1863, a Union scouting expedition led by General William P. Sanders arrived at Lenoir Station after having failed to destroy the railroad trestle at Loudon. Sanders burned the depot and the Lenoirs' sawmill and flour mill. He spared the cotton mill because there were few such mills in the area to provide cloth for the army. In addition, both he and the Lenoirs were Masons.

=== Lenoir City Company ===
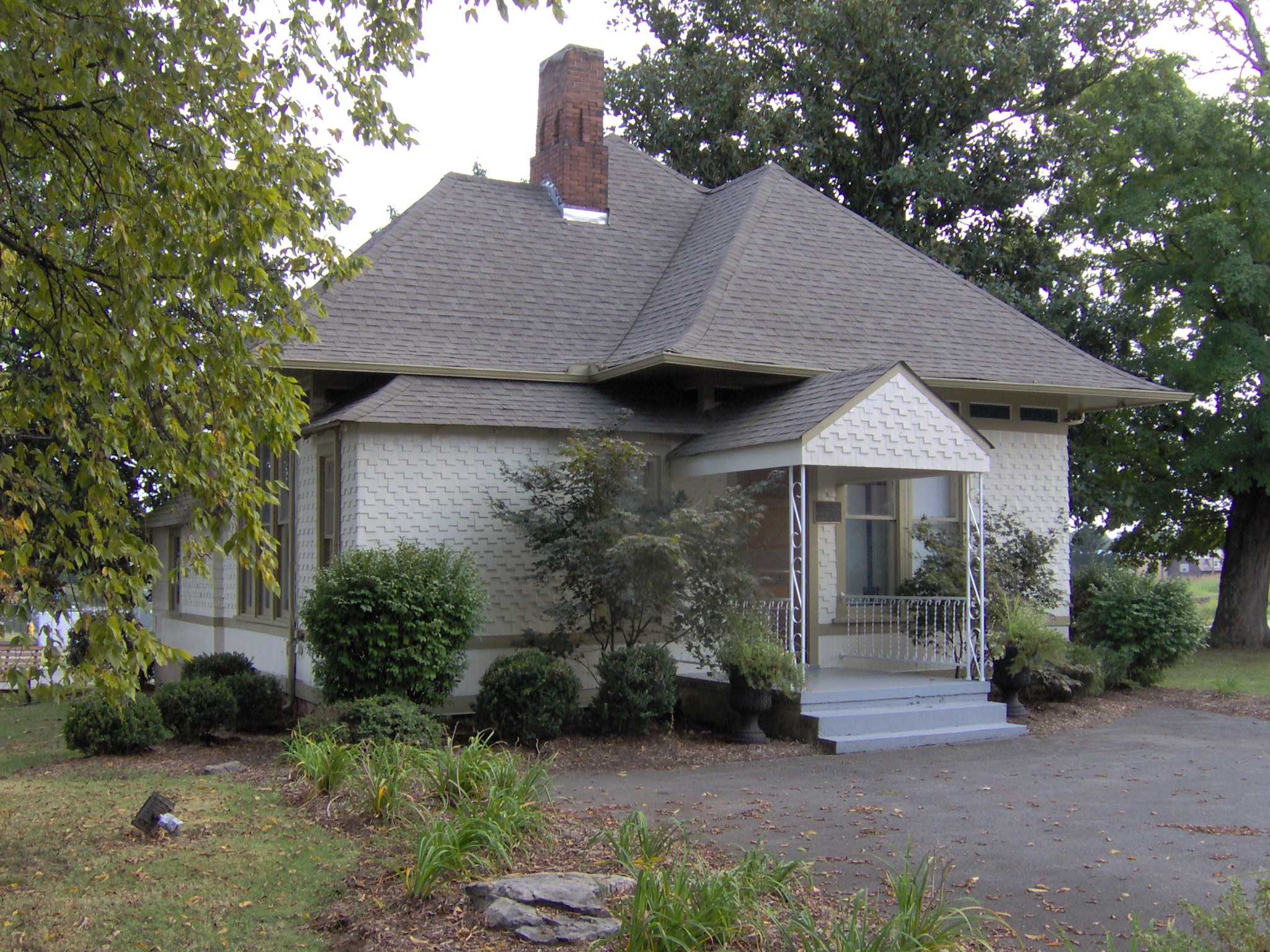
The Lenoir City Company office building, now the Lenoir City Museum, built in 1890 and designed by the Baumann Brothers

In the late 1880s, an abundance of financial capital, the popularity of social theories regarding planned cities, and a thriving coal mining industry in East Tennessee's Cumberland Plateau region led to the development of several company towns to support coal mining throughout the upper Tennessee Valley. Most of these were funded by investors from the Northeastern United States or Knoxville.

In 1889, Knoxville railroad magnate Charles McClung McGhee and his friend and associate Edward J. Sanford formed the Lenoir City Company. They believed the Lenoir plantation would be the ideal location to develop such a town. The company incorporated in April 1890 with $800,000 in stock and purchased the Lenoir estate, which then consisted of 2,700 acres (1,100 ha), for $300 per acre. When the company issued the stock to the public, the investors each received stock in the company and a lot in the planned town.

Lenoir City was laid out in a grid pattern with four quadrants, west of Town Creek and north of the railroad tracks. The city's northwest quadrant was planned for middle class and affluent residents, whereas the northeast quadrant would be for the city's wage-workers. The southwest quadrant would contain heavy industry, such as blast furnaces, steel works, and other large factories, while the southeast quadrant would contain woodworking, furniture, and canning factories. Influenced by late 19th-century reform movements that stressed health and temperance, the developers set aside several lots for public parks, and a large garden area was planned between the railroad tracks and the river.

A recession in the early 1890s froze financial markets. By 1892, the company had sold only 144 of the town's 3,448 lots. McGhee and Sanford persisted, however, and while Lenoir City never developed as fully as they had conceived, it survived. McGhee convinced a rail car company to open a factory in Lenoir City, and a short time later a knitting mill was established. Both establishments still employed several hundred workers in 1910.

=== 20th century ===
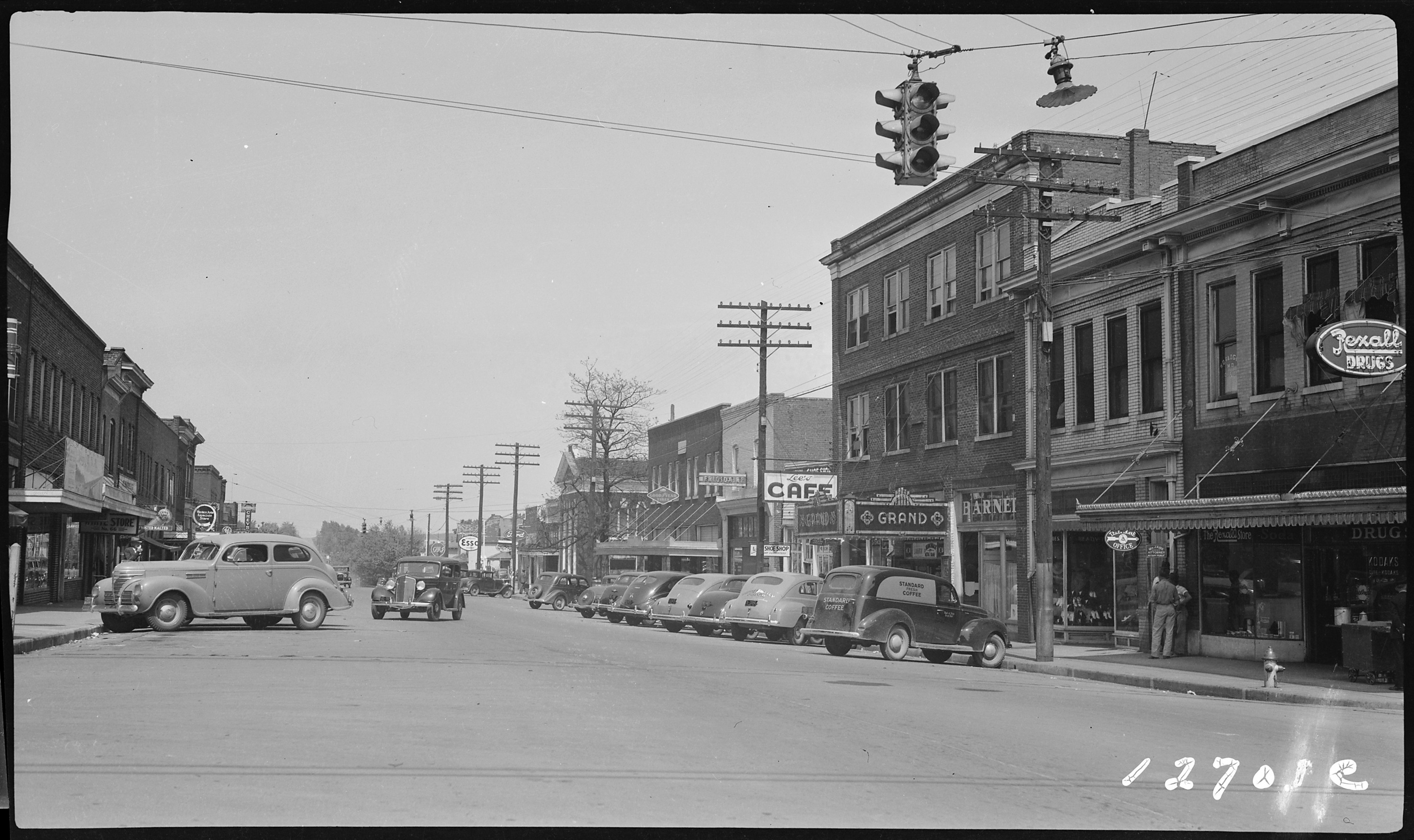
Lenoir City in 1940

Beginning in the 1930s during the Great Depression, a series of federal government projects provided a needed boost to Lenoir City's economy and invested in regional infrastructure. The Tennessee Valley Authority's construction of Fort Loudoun Dam and reservoir, which began in 1940, provided hundreds of locals with jobs. It also resulted in numerous road improvements and generation of hydropower for electrification of the region.

In the 1950s and 1960s, construction associated with the Interstate Highway System resulted in building I-75 and I-40—two trans-national highways that intersect just northeast of Lenoir City. U.S. Highway 321 was built through Lenoir City in the 1980s primarily to provide greater access to the Great Smoky Mountains National Park, some 40 miles (64 km) southeast.

In April 1985, Alice Clayton was elected Lenoir City's first woman city council member. Clayton came in second in the election and served a four-year term. Clayton was appointed by Mayor Charles Eblen as the street commissioner and served on the planning commission, the finance committee and the celebration committee for Homecoming '86, a celebration of Tennessee's 100th anniversary.

On February 21, 1993, an F-3 tornado touched down in eastern Roane County (just west of town) and tracked east-southeast directly toward the city. The tornado devastated parts of the city. Parts of downtown, as well as the area near A Street and 5th Avenue, were destroyed. The Lenoir City High School/Middle School property suffered major damage (it was redeveloped as River Oaks Place). The tornado continued east-southeastward, going through the town of Friendsville before lifting in western Maryville. One person died in Lenoir City, and 55 people were injured.

In March 1998, a historic landmark, the William B. Lenoir Hotel, the block of Broadway (US 11) between A and B streets, was destroyed by a massive fire. The entire block was lost as it had been built with a common attic and basement, meaning there were no firewalls between buildings. Wilburn's Barbershop, the Lenoir City Public Library, a Mexican grocery, offices for TV Readers magazine and Habitat for Humanity, a school photography company and photo finishing lab, and several apartments, were all destroyed by the blaze. This block was redeveloped for Roane State Community College, Tennessee Career Center, and a new Lenoir City Public Library.

=== 21st century ===
In the early 2000s, Lenoir City's economy expanded and many new businesses developed along U.S. Highway 321. Fort Loudoun Medical Center was built to replace the old Fort Sander's Loudon Hospital in nearby Loudon. In the late 2000s, two major commercial developments were announced. Creekwood Park is located parallel to I-75 between US-321 and US-70. A new four-lane road was built between the two highways. A luxury apartment complex was built on part of the site. In 2014, business development finally started in the area, with a few medical offices completed. From 2016 to 2017, the city constructed a new community center called "The Venue", and a new headquarters here for the Lenoir City Utilities Board here.

Dr. Bob Overholt, a local physician and TV personality, announced another development: The Market at Town Creek, planned to connect US-321 and Harrison Road near the Lenoir City High School and Middle School property. In 2013 Town Creek Parkway, a four-lane road connecting US-321 and Harrison Road, was completed. In 2016, the city appointed the second female city councilwoman, Jennifer Wampler. She was appointed to complete the remainder of the term vacated by the death of her late husband, Harry Wampler. The first woman elected to Lenoir City Council was Alice Clayton in April 1985.

== Geography ==
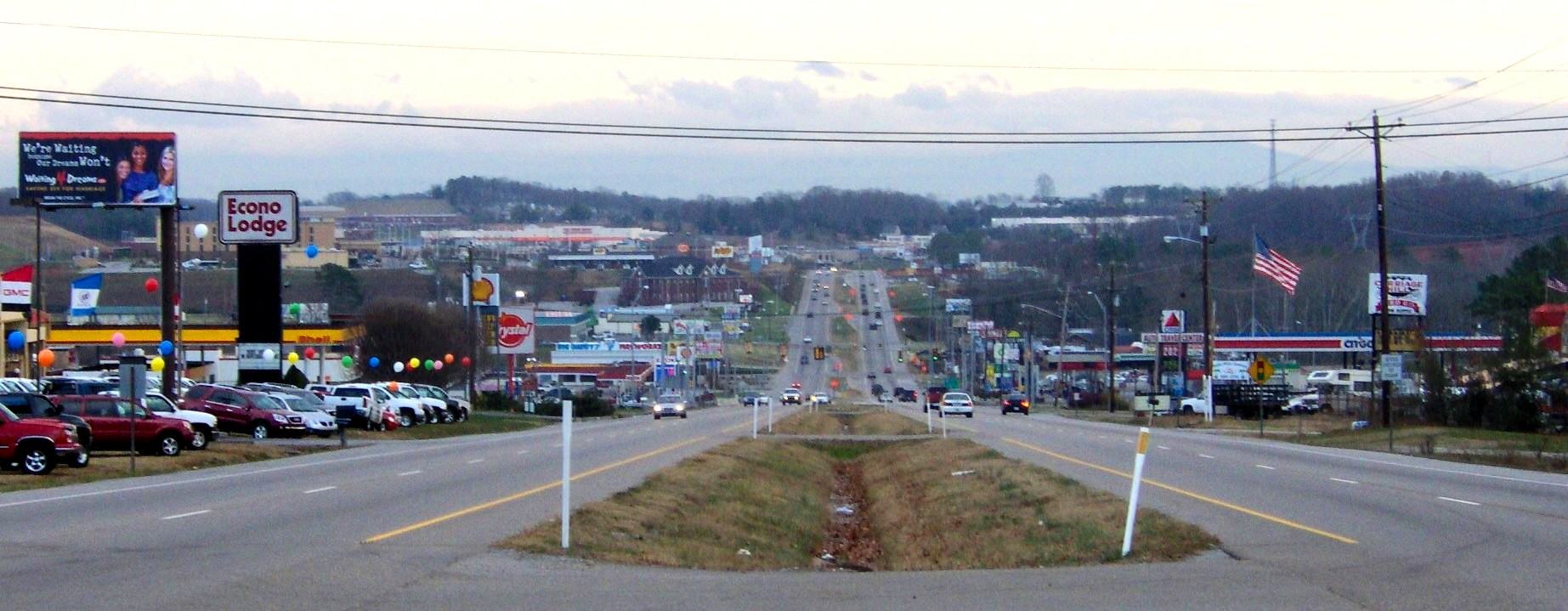
U.S. Highway 321 (Lamar Alexander Parkway) in Lenoir City

The Tennessee River and TVA's Fort Loudoun and Watts Bar reservations provide the city's southern boundary. Four major federal highways pass through Lenoir City: U.S. Route 11, which runs roughly parallel to the river shore, traverses the city east-to-west; U.S. Route 321, which crosses Fort Loudon Dam south of the city, traverses the city north-to-south. Interstate 75 and U.S. Route 70 intersect US-321 in the northern part of the city. I-75 provides access to the city from exit 81, and leads northeast 26 miles (42 km) to downtown Knoxville (via a connection with I-40), and southwest 91 miles (146 km) to Chattanooga. U.S. 321 runs through the center of town from southeast to northwest, leading northwest seven miles (11 km) to I-40 at exit 364 (the highway's northern terminus), and east twenty miles (32 km) to Maryville. U.S. 70 runs to the north of the city, leading northeast nine miles (14 km) to Farragut and northwest 19 miles (31 km) to Kingston. U.S. 11 runs through the center of the city, leading northeast to Farragut and Knoxville, and southwest seven miles (11 km) to the city of Loudon.

Lenoir City is traditionally spread out along US-11, west of the road's junction with US-321. This section of the city still roughly follows a grid plan laid out in the 1890s. In recent decades, Lenoir City has annexed a 5-mile (8.0 km) corridor of land along US-321 between its US-11 intersection and I-40 intersection. This corridor contains the city's newer, commercial area which caters to the high volume of traffic brought to the area by I-75 and I-40.

== Demographics ==
Historical population
Census	Pop.	Note	%±
1880	236		—
1910	3,392		—
1920	4,210		24.1%
1930	4,470		6.2%
1940	4,373		−2.2%
1950	5,159		18.0%
1960	4,979		−3.5%
1970	5,324		6.9%
1980	5,180		−2.7%
1990	6,147		18.7%
2000	6,819		10.9%
2010	8,642		26.7%
2020	10,117		17.1%
2025 (est.)	12,530	▲	23.9%

=== 2020 census ===
As of the 2020 census, Lenoir City had a population of 10,117. The median age was 35.3 years. 26.3% of residents were under the age of 18 and 14.4% of residents were 65 years of age or older. For every 100 females there were 93.3 males, and for every 100 females age 18 and over there were 90.3 males age 18 and over.

99.6% of residents lived in urban areas, while 0.4% lived in rural areas.

There were 3,918 households in Lenoir City, of which 35.2% had children under the age of 18 living in them. Of all households, 44.4% were married-couple households, 18.7% were households with a male householder and no spouse or partner present, and 29.6% were households with a female householder and no spouse or partner present. About 29.1% of all households were made up of individuals and 12.2% had someone living alone who was 65 years of age or older.

There were 4,247 housing units, of which 7.7% were vacant. The homeowner vacancy rate was 1.8% and the rental vacancy rate was 6.5%.

Racial composition as of the 2020 census
Race	Number	Percent
White	7,524	74.4%
Black or African American	135	1.3%
American Indian and Alaska Native	59	0.6%
Asian	115	1.1%
Native Hawaiian and Other Pacific Islander	1	0.0%
Some other race	1,225	12.1%
Two or more races	1,058	10.5%
Hispanic or Latino (of any race)	2,355	23.3%

=== 2010 census ===
As of the census of 2010, there was a population of 8,642, with 3,369 households and 2,183 families residing in the city. There were 3,703 housing units. The racial makeup of the city was 87.30% White, 1.60% African American, 0.50% Native American, 0.60% Asian, 0.30% Pacific Islander, 8.0% from other races, and 1.80% from two or more races. Hispanic or Latino of any race were 17.50% of the population.

=== 2000 census ===
As of the 2000 census, there were 2,910 households, out of which 30.4% had children under the age of 18 living with them, 44.5% were married couples living together, 13.8% had a female householder with no husband present, and 37.6% were non-families. 33.2% of all households were made up of individuals, and 14.7% had someone living alone who was 65 years of age or older. The average household size was 2.33 and the average family size was 2.95.

In the city, the population was spread out, with 25.0% under the age of 18, 9.3% from 18 to 24, 30.3% from 25 to 44, 20.8% from 45 to 64, and 14.6% who were 65 years of age or older. The median age was 35 years. For every hundred females, there were 90.3 males; for every hundred females age 18 and over, there were 85.5 males.

The median income for a household in the city was $28,889, and the median income for a family was $33,462. Males had a median income of $27,229 versus $20,744 for females. The per capita income for the city was $16,632. About 13.4% of families and 16.0% of the population were below the poverty line, including 22.1% of those under age 18 and 8.9% of those age 65 or over.

== Government ==
The City of Lenoir City operates under a Mayor/City Council Form. The mayor is elected on four-year terms. The City Council is elected every four years.

== Education ==
Residents are zoned to both city and county schools. Because of the proximity of the county schools to Lenoir City and the distance to the county high schools (Loudon High School and Greenback School), most students who attend county schools within the city through elementary and middle grades (Kindergarten through eighth) transfer to the city school system upon enrolling in high school.

=== Lenoir City Schools ===
- Lenoir City Elementary School
- Lenoir City Intermediate Middle School
- Lenoir City High School

=== Loudon County Schools within Lenoir City ===
- Eaton Elementary School
- North Middle School
- Highland Park Elementary School

== Climate ==
The climate in this area is characterized by relatively high temperatures and evenly distributed precipitation throughout the year. According to the Köppen Climate Classification system, Lenoir City has a Humid subtropical climate, abbreviated "Cfa" on climate maps.

Climate data for Lenoir City, Tennessee (1991–2020 normals, extremes 1962–present)
Month	Jan	Feb	Mar	Apr	May	Jun	Jul	Aug	Sep	Oct	Nov	Dec	Year
Record high °F (°C)	75 (24)	80 (27)	85 (29)	91 (33)	95 (35)	102 (39)	106 (41)	104 (40)	99 (37)	97 (36)	85 (29)	77 (25)	106 (41)
Mean daily maximum °F (°C)	48.6 (9.2)	53.1 (11.7)	62.0 (16.7)	71.4 (21.9)	79.0 (26.1)	85.9 (29.9)	89.0 (31.7)	88.4 (31.3)	83.5 (28.6)	72.9 (22.7)	61.2 (16.2)	52.0 (11.1)	70.6 (21.4)
Daily mean °F (°C)	38.3 (3.5)	41.9 (5.5)	49.7 (9.8)	58.5 (14.7)	67.1 (19.5)	75.0 (23.9)	78.5 (25.8)	77.6 (25.3)	71.9 (22.2)	60.3 (15.7)	48.9 (9.4)	41.7 (5.4)	59.1 (15.1)
Mean daily minimum °F (°C)	28.0 (−2.2)	30.7 (−0.7)	37.4 (3.0)	45.5 (7.5)	55.2 (12.9)	64.1 (17.8)	68.1 (20.1)	66.8 (19.3)	60.2 (15.7)	47.6 (8.7)	36.6 (2.6)	31.3 (−0.4)	47.6 (8.7)
Record low °F (°C)	−14 (−26)	−7 (−22)	1 (−17)	23 (−5)	32 (0)	39 (4)	50 (10)	48 (9)	33 (1)	24 (−4)	11 (−12)	−5 (−21)	−14 (−26)
Average precipitation inches (mm)	4.99 (127)	5.22 (133)	5.09 (129)	5.16 (131)	4.29 (109)	4.24 (108)	5.12 (130)	3.82 (97)	4.25 (108)	3.02 (77)	4.14 (105)	5.86 (149)	55.20 (1,402)
Average snowfall inches (cm)	1.6 (4.1)	1.3 (3.3)	0.6 (1.5)	0.0 (0.0)	0.0 (0.0)	0.0 (0.0)	0.0 (0.0)	0.0 (0.0)	0.0 (0.0)	0.0 (0.0)	0.1 (0.25)	0.4 (1.0)	4.0 (10)
Average precipitation days (≥ 0.01 in)	11.2	10.5	11.4	10.4	10.6	11.2	11.1	9.4	7.8	7.5	9.0	11.1	121.2
Average snowy days (≥ 0.1 in)	0.6	0.6	0.3	0.0	0.0	0.0	0.0	0.0	0.0	0.0	0.1	0.1	1.7
Source: NOAA

== Notable people ==
- Tommy Bartlett, basketball coach
- John Bowers, author
- Tom Collins, music producer
- Claire Donahue, Olympic gold-medal swimmer
- Lee Guetterman, baseball pitcher
- Graig Nettles, baseball player
- Kenny Roberts, country musician
