= Preston (surname) =

Preston is a surname. Notable people with the name include:

== People ==
=== A ===
- Aileen Preston (1889–1974), Irish chauffeur and suffragette
- Al Preston (1926–1979), American baseball player
- Alan Preston (1932–2004), New Zealand soccer player
- Alan Preston (jeweller) (born 1941), New Zealand jeweller
- Alex Preston (author) (born 1979), English author and journalist
- Alex Preston (singer) (born 1993), American singer
- Alice Bolam Preston (1888–1958), American illustrator
- Alison Preston, Australian economist
- Allan Preston (born 1969), Scottish footballer
- Amber Preston, stand-up comedian
- Amyas Preston (died 1609), English privateer
- Andrej Preston (born c. 1986), Slovenian internet personality
- Andrew Preston (businessman) (1846–1924), American businessman
- Andrew Preston (historian) (born 1973), Canadian historian
- Andy Preston (footballer), Australian rules footballer
- Andy Preston (politician), English politician, charity chairman, and businessman
- Ann Preston (1813–1872), American doctor and educator
- Ann Preston (1910–2002), American actress better known as Shaindel Kalish
- Anne E. Preston (born 1955), American economist
- Anthony Preston (disambiguation)
  - Anthony Preston (music producer), American record producer and songwriter
  - Antony Preston (1938–2004), English naval historian
- Arthur Preston (bishop) (1883–1936), Anglican bishop
- Arthur Preston (priest) (1761–1844), Irish Anglican priest
- Arthur Edwin Preston (1852–1942), English antiquarian and historian
- Arthur Murray Preston (1913–1968), US Navy officer
- Ashlee Marie Preston (born 1984), American media personality, producer, and activist
- Astrid Preston (born 1945), Swedish-American artist

=== B ===
- Ben Preston (born 1963), British journalist
- Benjamin Preston (1846–1914), English cricketer
- Beryl Preston (1901–1979), British sailor
- Bill Preston (1893–1954), American football player
- Billy Preston (1946–2006), American musician
- Billy Preston (basketball) (born 1997), American basketball player
- Bob Preston (1895–1945), Scottish footballer
- Brian Preston (born 1958), Australian judge
- Byron W. Preston (1858–1939), American judge

=== C ===
- Callum Preston (born 1995), British footballer
- Carl Preston (born 1991), English footballer
- Carrie Preston (born 1967), American actress
- Chanel Preston (born 1985), American pornographic film actress
- Charles Preston (c. 1735 – 1800), British Army officer in Canada
- Charles M. Preston (1848–1909), American politician
- Charles Swainson of Preston (1780–1866), English businessman
- Cheryl Preston, American scholar
- Cynthia Preston (born 1968), Canadian actress

=== D ===
- D'Arcy Preston (1765–1847), Royal Navy Admiral
- Dan Preston (born 1991), English footballer
- Danny Preston (born 2000), English footballer
- Darryl Preston, British politician
- Daryl W. Preston (1939–2023), American astronomer and physicist
- Dave Preston (American football) (born 1955), American football player
- Dave Preston (motorcycling) (born c. 1947), American motorcycle writer
- David Preston (banker) (1826–1887), American banker
- David L. Preston (born 1972), American historian
- Dean Preston (born 1969), American politician
- Denis Preston (1916–1979), British record producer and music critic
- Dennis Preston, Australian rugby league footballer
- Derek Preston (born 1936), English cricketer
- Don Preston (born 1932), American musician
- Don Preston (guitarist) (born 1942), American musician
- Donna Preston (born 1986), English actress and comedian
- Donnie Preston (1914–2006), South African cricketer
- Douglas Preston (born 1956), American author
- Douglas A. Preston (1858–1929), American lawyer and politician
- Duke Preston (born 1982), American football player
- Duncan Preston (born 1946), British actor

=== E ===
- Eddie Preston (1925–2009), American musician
- Edward Preston (1831–1890), lawyer and judge in Hawaii
- Edward Carter Preston (1885–1965), English artist
- Edwina Preston, Australian musician and author
- Effa E. Preston (1884–1975), American educator

=== F ===
- Forrest Preston (born 1933), American businessman
- Frances E. L. Preston (1844–1929), African-American activist
- Frances W. Preston (1928–2012), American music executive
- Francis Preston (1765–1836), American lawyer and politician
- Francis Preston (sailor) (1913–1975), British sailor
- Frank W. Preston (1896–1989), American ecologist, engineer, and conservationist
- Fraser Preston (born 1999), Scottish footballer
- Frederick George Preston (1862–1964), British gardener

=== G ===
- Gaylene Preston (born 1947), New Zealand film director
- George Preston (British Army officer, died 1748) (1659–1746), involved in the Jacobite risings
- George Preston (British Army officer, died 1785) (1707–1785), led the Royal Scots Greys
- George Dawson Preston (1896–1972), British physicist
- George Henry Preston (1911–2003), British gardener
- George L. Preston (born 1929 or 1930), American politician
- George Nelson Preston (born 1938), Ghanaian historian
- Gerry Preston, New Zealand boxing trainer
- Glenn Preston (born 1992), New Zealand rugby union player
- Gordon Preston (1925–2015), English mathematician
- Greg Preston (born 1960), American photographer and writer
- Guy Preston (1884–1947), South African cricketer
- Guy H. Preston (1864–1952), US Army brigadier general

=== H ===
- Harriet Waters Preston (1836–1911), American writer and translator
- Harry Preston (field hockey) (1931–2004), Canadian field hockey player
- Harry Preston (writer) (1923–2009), South African writer
- Henry Preston (cricketer) (1883–1964), English cricketer
- Sir Henry Preston, 3rd Baronet (1851–1897), English soldier, magistrate and footballer
- Herbert Irving Preston (1876–1928), American Medal of Honor recipient
- Heron Preston (born 1983), American fashion designer
- Hod Preston (1917–1995), American automobile racer
- Hubert Preston (1868–1960), British journalist

=== I ===
- Isaac Mosher Preston (1813–1880), American politician
- Isaac Trimble Preston (1793–1852), American judge
- Isabella Preston (1881–1965), Canadian horticulturist

=== J ===
- J. A. Preston (born 1932), American actor
- J. N. Preston (1832–1922), American architect
- Jack Preston (1878–1939), English international rugby league footballer
- Jacob Preston (rugby league) (born 2001), Australian rugby league footballer
- Jacob A. Preston (1796–1868), American politician
- James Preston (cricketer) (1792–1842), English cricketer
- James Preston (runner) (born 1997), New Zealand athlete
- James B. Preston (1926–2004), American neurophysiologist,
- James B. Preston (politician) (died 1902), American politician
- James H. Preston (1860–1938), American lawyer and politician
- James Moore Preston (1873–1962), American painter
- James Patton Preston (1774–1843), American politician
- James Rhea Preston (1853–1922), American educator
- Jan Preston, New Zealand musician
- Jason Preston (born 1999), American basketball player
- Jean R. Preston (1935–2013), American politician
- Jenico Preston, 14th Viscount Gormanston (1837–1907), Anglo-Irish colonial administrator
- Jessie Preston (1872–1962), American metalsmith
- Jimmy Preston (1913–1984), American musician
- Joanna Preston (born 1972), New Zealand poet and editor
- Joe Preston (musician) (born 1969), American musician
- Joe Preston (politician) (born 1955), Canadian politician
- John Preston (disambiguation), including
  - John Preston (American author) (1945–1994), American writer
  - John Preston (dog handler) (1945–2008), American dog handler
  - John Preston (English author) (born 1953), English journalist and novelist
  - John Preston (fencer) (born 1928), Welsh fencer
  - John Preston (luthier), English 18th-century luthier
  - John Preston (Medal of Honor) (1841–1885), Union Navy sailor in the American Civil War
  - John Preston (music executive) (1950–2017), British music industry executive
  - John Preston (priest) (1587–1628), Anglican minister
  - John Preston (rebel) (died 1381), English rebel
  - John B. Preston, American surveyor
  - John David Preston (born 1950), American politician
  - John F. Preston (1872–1960), US Army Inspector General
  - John G. Preston, American actor
  - John S. Preston (1809–1881), American planter, soldier, and attorney
  - John T. Preston, American venture capitalist
  - John Thomas Lewis Preston (1811–1890), American lawyer
  - John W. Preston (1877–1958), American judge
- Johnny Preston (1939–2011), American singer
- Jon Preston (born 1967), New Zealand rugby union player
- Joseph Preston (cricketer) (1864–1890), English cricketer
- Joseph Preston Jr. (born 1947), American politician
- Joseph E. Preston (born 1956), American politician
- Josephine Corliss Preston (1873–1958), American educator and politician
- Josiah Preston (1885–unknown), English footballer
- Josiah Johnston Preston (1855–1937), Canadian businessman and politician
- Julia Preston (born 1951), American journalist
- Julia Carter Preston (1926–2012), British artist
- Julieanna Preston, New Zealand academic and spatial artist
- June Preston (1928–2022), American actress and singer

=== K ===
- Kamau Preston (born 1979), Jamaican musician
- Karen Preston (born 1971), Canadian figure skater
- Katharine Preston, British writer and public speaker
- Katherine Preston (1868–1951), British college head
- Katherine K. Preston (born 1950), American musicologist
- Keith Preston (1884–1927), American journalist
- Kelly Preston (1962–2020), American actress
- Ken Preston (1925–2019), English cricketer
- Ken Preston (Canadian football) (1917–1991), Canadian football player, coach and executive
- Kenneth Preston (born 1957), American soldier
- Kenneth Preston (sailor) (1901–1995), British sailor
- Kiki Preston (1898–1946), American socialite
- Kyle Preston (born 1999), New Zealand rugby union player

=== L ===
- Lewis Preston (basketball) (born 1970), American college basketball coach
- Lewis Thompson Preston (1926–1995), American banker
- Lionel Preston (1875–1971), Royal Navy officer
- Luke Preston (born 1976), Welsh judoka

=== M ===
- Margaret Preston (1875–1963), Australian artist
- Margaret Junkin Preston (1820–1897), American poet and author
- Mark Preston (businessman) (born 1968), Australian motorsport professional
- Mark Preston (political analyst) (born 1971), American journalist
- Mark Preston (rugby) (born 1967), English rugby player
- Mathis Preston (born 2008), Canadian ice hockey player
- Matilee Loeb-Evans Preston (1879–1963), American composer
- Matt Preston (born 1961), Australian journalist
- Matt Preston (footballer) (born 1995), English footballer
- Maurice A. Preston (1912–1983), United States Air Force general
- May Wilson Preston (1873–1949), American artist
- Michael Preston (born 1934), English actor
- Michael Preston (American football) (born 1989), American football player
- Michael Preston (footballer) (born 1977), English footballer
- Michael J. Preston, American academic
- Michelle Preston (born 1978), New Zealand boxer
- Mike Preston (curler) (1944–2009), Welsh wheelchair curler

=== N ===
- Natalie Preston (born 1977), English footballer
- Natasha Preston (born 1988), English novelist
- Neal Preston (born 1952), American photographer
- Nicholas Preston, 17th Viscount Gormanston (born 1939)
- Nick Preston (born 1972), English cricketer
- Nick Preston (rugby union) (born 1958), English international rugby union player
- Nigel Preston (1959–1992), British musician
- Noel Preston (1941–2020), ethicist, theologian and social commentator
- Norman Preston (1903–1980), English cricket journalist

=== O ===
- Oliver Preston (born 1962), British cartoonist

=== P ===
- Paschal Preston, Irish author and academic
- Pat Preston (1921–2002), American football player, coach, and administrator
- Paul Preston (born 1946), British historian
- Peter Preston (1938–2018), British journalist
- Peter Preston (politician) (1935–2016), Canadian politician
- Platt A. Preston (1837–1900), American politician
- Prince Hulon Preston, Jr. (1908–1961), American politician, educator and lawyer

=== R ===
- Rachel Oakes Preston (1809–1868), member of Seventh-day Adventist Church
- Ray Preston (American football) (born 1954), American football player
- Ray Preston (Australian footballer) (1930–2015), Australian rules footballer
- Ray Preston (rugby league) (1929–2019), Australian rugby league footballer
- Rebecca Preston (born 1979), Australian triathlete
- Reg Preston (1917–2000), Australian potter
- Rich Preston (born 1952), Canadian ice hockey player
- Richard Preston (born 1954), American author
- Richard Preston (clergyman) (1791–1861), American religious leader
- Richard Preston (MP) (1768–1850), English legal author and politician
- Richard Franklin Preston (1860–1929), Canadian physician and politician
- Richard Graham, 1st Viscount Preston (1648–1695), English diplomat and politician
- Rob Preston (born 1982), American basketball player
- Robert Preston (disambiguation), multiple people, including
  - Robert Preston (actor) (1918–1987), American actor and singer
  - Robert Preston (American politician) (1929–2021), American politician
  - Robert E. Preston (1836–1911), Director of the United States Mint
  - Robert Hamilton of Preston (1650–1701), Scottish Presbyterian leader
  - Robert Henry Preston (1840–1926), Canadian politician
- Robyn Preston, Australian politician
- Rock Preston (born 1975), American gridiron football player
- Roell Preston (born 1972), American football player
- Ron Preston (born 1958), American speedway rider

=== S ===
- Sally Preston (born 1964), British entrepreneur
- Samantha Preston (born 1984), Canadian curler
- Samuel Preston (mayor) (1665–1743), American merchant, jurist and mayor
- Samuel Dylan Murray Preston (born 1982), English singer known simply as Preston
- Samuel H. Preston (born 1943), American demographer
- Samuel Tolver Preston (1844–1917), British physicist
- Samuel W. Preston (1840–1865), United States Navy officer
- Sarah Preston (born 1970), English actress
- Shazz Preston (born 2003), American football receiver
- Shelley Preston (born 1964), English singer
- Simon Preston (1938–2022), British organist and composer
- Stephen Preston (cricketer) (1905–1995), English cricketer
- Stephen Preston (flautist) (born 1945), English flautist
- Stephen Preston (footballer) (born 1879), English footballer
- Stephen W. Preston (born 1957), American lawyer
- Steve Preston (born 1960), American businessman and civil servant

=== T ===
- Tabort Etaka Preston (born 1998), Cameroonian footballer
- Taylah Preston (born 2005), Australian tennis player
- Thomas Preston (disambiguation), multiple people, including
  - Thomas Preston (British Army officer) (1722-1798), British imperial military officer
  - Thomas Preston (composer) (died c. 1563), English organist and composer
  - Thomas Preston (died 1604), English politician
  - Thomas Preston (footballer) (1893–1971), Scottish footballer
  - Thomas Preston (monk) (1563–1640), English Benedictine monk
  - Thomas Preston (scientist) (1860–1900), Irish physicist
  - Thomas Preston (writer) (1537–1598), English Master of Trinity Hall, Cambridge
  - Thomas Hildebrand Preston (1886–1976), British diplomat
  - Thomas Hiram Preston (1855–1925), Canadian politician
  - Thomas Scott Preston (1824–1891), Roman Catholic Vicar-General of New York
- Tommy Preston (1932–2015), Scottish footballer
- Travis Preston (born 1963), American director and theater artist
- Trevor Preston (1938–2018), British screenwriter

=== W ===
- Walt Preston (1868–1937), American baseball player
- Walter Preston (American politician) (1819–1867), Confederate politician
- Walter Preston (British politician) (1875–1946), British politician
- Walter W. Preston (1863–1951), American politician
- Ward Preston (1932–2016), American production designer and art director
- Wayde Preston (1929–1992), American actor
- Willard Preston (1785–1856), President of the University of Vermont
- William Preston (disambiguation), multiple people, including
  - William Preston (actor) (1921–1998), American actor
  - William Preston (bishop) (1729–1789), Irish Anglican bishop
  - William Preston (British politician) (1874–1941), British industrialist and politician
  - William Preston (Freemason) (1742–1818), Scottish author, editor and lecturer
  - William Preston (Kentucky soldier) (1816–1887), Confederate Army general
  - William Preston (poet) (1753–1807), Irish poet
  - William Preston (Virginia soldier) (1729–1783), Irish-born American military officer, planter and politician
  - William Alfred Preston (1848–1944), Canadian politician
  - William B. Preston (1805–1862), American politician
  - William B. Preston (Mormon) (1830–1908), American LDS Church bishop
  - William C. Preston (1794–1860), American politician
  - William Edward Hayter Preston (1891–1964), British author and literary editor
  - William G. Preston (1842–1910), American architect
- Willie Preston (born 1985), American politician

=== Y ===
- Yves Preston (born 1956), Canadian ice hockey player

== Fictional characters ==
- Becky Preston, from the Shiloh films
- Dara Lynn Preston, from the Shiloh films
- Dr. Preston Burke, from Grey's Anatomy
- Marty Preston, from the Shiloh films
- Sergeant William Preston, from the radio series Challenge of the Yukon and the television series Sergeant Preston of the Yukon

== See also ==
- Preston (disambiguation)
- Preston (given name)
- General Preston (disambiguation)
- Justice Preston (disambiguation)
- Senator Preston (disambiguation)
- Prestin (surname)
