= William Preston =

William Preston may refer to:

- William Preston (actor) (1921–1998), American actor
- William Preston (Freemason) (1742–1818), Scottish author of Illustrations of Masonry
- William Preston (Kentucky soldier) (1816–1887), U.S. politician, ambassador, and Confederate officer
- William Preston (poet) (1753–1807), Irish poet
- William Preston (Virginia soldier) (1729–1783), Irish-born frontier Virginia leader, signer of the Fincastle Resolutions
- William Preston (Royal Navy officer), captain in the British Royal Navy who, along with James Stirling, was responsible for the foundations of Perth and Fremantle in Western Australia
- William Preston (British politician) (1874–1941), Conservative M.P. for Walsall, 1924–1929
- William Alfred Preston (1848–1944), MPP in Ontario, Canada
- William B. Preston (Mormon) (1830–1908), presiding bishop of the Church of Jesus Christ of Latter-day Saints, 1884–1907
- William B. Preston (1805–1862), U.S. politician from Virginia
  - USS William B. Preston, a United States Navy Clemson-class destroyer
- William C. Preston (1794–1860), U.S. politician from Pennsylvania who was a U.S. senator for South Carolina
- William G. Preston (1842–1910), American architect
- William Preston (bishop) (1729–1789), Anglican bishop in Ireland
- William Edward Hayter Preston (1891–1964), British literary editor, journalist, poet and author
- Billy Preston (1946–2006), American musician
  - Billy Preston (album), 1976
- Billy Preston (basketball) (born 1997), American basketball player
- Bill Preston (1893–1954), American football tackle
- Willie Preston (born 1985), member of the Illinois Senate

== Fictional ==
- Sergeant William Preston of the Northwest Mounted Police, lead character in the radio and TV series Challenge of the Yukon
