= John Preston =

John Preston may refer to:

== Politicians ==
- John Preston (died 1434), Member of Parliament (MP) for Sussex
- John Preston (c. 1578 – c. 1642), MP for Lancaster
- John Preston (alderman) (1611–1686), mayor of Dublin in 1654
- John Preston (died 1732), MP for County Meath
- John Preston (died 1753), MP for Navan
- John Preston (died 1781), MP for Navan
- John Preston, 1st Baron Tara (1764–1821), Irish politician
- John B. Preston, first Surveyor General of the Oregon Territory

== Fiction ==
- John Preston, a fictional character in the 2002 feature film Equilibrium
- John James Preston, a fictional character in the American TV series Sex and the City
- Alias John Preston, a 1955 British horror film

== Military ==
- John S. Preston (1809–1881), American Civil War general
- John Preston (Medal of Honor) (1841–1885), American Civil War sailor and Medal of Honor recipient
- John F. Preston (1872–1960), United States Army officer, Inspector General
- John Thomas Lewis Preston (1811–1890), American educator and military officer from Virginia

== Others ==
- John Preston (rebel) (died 1381), participant in Peasants' Revolt
- John Preston (priest) (1587–1628), English clergyman
- John Preston, Lord Fentonbarns (died 1616), Scottish judge
- John Preston (settler) (1699–1747), Irish immigrant to America, founder of the Preston dynasty
- John Preston (luthier), 18th-century English guitar and cittern maker
- John W. Preston (1877–1958), American judge
- Jack Preston (John Preston), English rugby league player of the 1900s
- Johnny Preston (1939–2011), American pop music singer
- John Preston (American author) (1945–1994), American author of gay erotica
- John Preston (music executive) (1950–2017), British music industry executive
- John Preston (English author) (born 1953), English journalist and novelist
- John G. Preston (born 1960s), American film and stage actor
- John Preston (dog handler) (1945–2008), law enforcement officer whose dog was involved in controversial criminal cases in Florida
- John T. Preston, venture capitalist and entrepreneur
- John Preston (fencer), Welsh fencer
