= Preston (given name) =

Preston is a masculine given name which may refer to:

== People ==
=== A ===
- Preston Arsement (born 1994), American YouTuber better known as PrestonPlayz

=== B ===
- Preston Bassett (1892–1992), American inventor and engineer
- Preston Blair (1908–1995), American animator
- Preston J. Bradshaw (1884–1952), American architect
- Preston Brooks (1819–1857), American politician
- Preston Brown (linebacker) (born 1992), American football player
- Preston Brown (wide receiver) (born 1958), American football player
- Preston Brown (United States Army officer) (1872–1948), American general
- Preston M. Burch (1884–1978), American racehorse trainer
- Preston Burpo (born 1972), American soccer player
- Preston Bynum (1939-2018), American politician and businessman

=== C ===
- Preston Campbell (born 1977), Australian rugby league footballer
- Preston W. Campbell (1874–1954), American lawyer
- Preston Carpenter (1934–2011), American football player
- Preston Carrington (born 1949), American athlete
- Preston C. Clayton (1903–1996), justice of the Supreme Court of Alabama
- Preston Cloud (1912–1991), American paleontologist and geologist
- Preston Scott Cohen, American architect
- Preston Corderman (died 1998), American army officer
- Preston Covey, American philosopher

=== D ===
- Preston Daniels, American politician and first African-American mayor of Des Moines, Iowa
- Preston Davie (1881–1967), American lawyer and colonel
- Preston Davis (American football) (born 1962), American football player
- Preston Davis (politician) (1907–1990), American politician
- Preston Delano (c.1886–1961), American businessman
- Preston Dennard (born 1955), American football player
- Preston Dickinson (1889–1930), American artist
- Preston Doerflinger (born 1973), American businessman and politician

=== E ===
- Preston Edwards (born 1989), English footballer
- Preston Elliott (1875–1939), Canadian farmer and politician
- Preston Epps (1930–2019), American musician
- Preston Estep, American biologist

=== F ===
- Preston Fleet (1934–1995), American businessman
- Preston Foster (1900–1970), American actor

=== G ===
- Preston Glass (born 1960}, American songwriter and producer
- Preston Gothard (born 1962), American football player
- Preston Griffall (born 1984), American luger
- Preston Gómez (1923–2009), Cuban-born baseball player

=== H ===
- Preston Hanna (1954–2023), American baseball player
- Preston Hanson (1921–2008), American actor
- Preston Haskell (born 1938), American businessman
- Preston Henn (1931–2017), American entrepreneur
- Preston Heyman, British drummer
- Preston Hodge (born 2002), American football player
- Preston Holder (1907–1980), American archaeologist and photographer

=== J ===
- Preston Jackson (1902–1983), American musician
- Preston Jones (actor) (born 1983), American actor
- Preston Jones (gridiron football) (born 1970), American football player
- Preston Jones (playwright) (1936–1979), American playwright

=== K ===
- Preston Keat (born 1966), American political scientist
- Preston King (academic) (born 1936), American academic
- Preston King (mayor) (1863–1943), mayor of Bath, England
- Preston King (politician) (1806–1865), American politician
- Preston Knowles (born 1989), American basketball player

=== L ===
- Preston Lacy (born 1969), American actor
- Preston Lea (1841–1916), American businessman and politician
- Preston Leslie (1819–1907), American politician
- Preston Lockwood (1912–1996), English actor
- Preston Love (1921–2004), American jazz musician

=== M ===
- Preston McAfee (born 1956), American economist
- Preston McGann, American football player
- Preston Manning (born 1942), Canadian politician
- Preston Martin (1923–2007), American banker
- Preston Mattingly (born 1987), American baseball executive
- Preston D. Miller, periodontist
- Preston Mitchell, American football coach
- Preston Mommsen (born 1987), South African-born Scottish cricketer

=== N ===
- Preston Nash, American musician
- Preston Nibley (1884–1966), American religious leader
- Preston Nichols (born 1946), American author

=== O ===
- Preston Ware Orem (1865–1938), American composer, pianist and writer

=== P ===
- Preston A. Pairo Jr. (1927–2010), American politician from Maryland
- Preston Parker (born 1987), American football player
- Preston Parks, American politician
- Preston Parsons (born 1979), American football player
- Preston Pearson (born 1945), American football player
- Preston E. Peden (1914–1985), American politician
- Preston B. Plumb (1837–1891), American politician
- Preston Powers (1842–1904), American sculptor, painter and teacher

=== Q ===
- Preston Quick (born 1978), American squash player

=== R ===
- Preston Reed (born 1955), American guitarist
- Preston Richards (1881-1952), American lawyer
- Preston Ridd (born 1953), New Zealand darts player
- Preston Ridlehuber (born 1943), American football player
- Preston Ritter (1949–2015), musician

=== S ===
- Preston Shumpert (born 1979), American-Turkish basketball player
- Preston Singletary (born 1963), American glass artist
- Preston Smith (disambiguation)
- Preston Stone (born 2001), American football player
- Preston Strother (born 1999), American actor
- Preston Sturges (1898–1959), American writer and director
- Preston Stutzman, American film producer and actor

=== T ===
- Preston Robert Tisch (1926–2005), American businessman
- Preston Tucker (1903–1956), American automobile designer and entrepreneur

=== V ===
- Preston Valien (1914-1995), African-American sociologist

=== W ===
- Preston Ward (1927–2013), American baseball player
- Preston Ware (1821–1890), American chess player
- Preston Washington (1948–2003), American religious leader
- Preston Watson (1880–1915), Scottish aviator
- Preston A. Whitmore II, American screenwriter, producer and director
- Preston Wilson (born 1974), American baseball player
- Preston Williams (born 1997), American football player

=== Y ===
- Preston Young (born 1954), Canadian football player

=== Z ===
- Preston Zimmerman (born 1988), American soccer player
- Preston Zinter (born 2004), American football player

== Fictional characters ==
- Preston "Bodie" Broadus, from The Wire
- Preston Garvey, from Fallout 4
- Preston Meyers, from Can't Hardly Wait
- Preston Northwest, from Gravity Falls
- Preston Pike, from Afraid
- Preston Tien, from Power Rangers Ninja Steel
- Preston Winthrop Esq., from MySims Agents
- Preston, a medical student and former guard's apprentice in the Tiffany Aching subseries of Discworld
- Preston, the robot dog in the Wallace and Gromit film A Close Shave
- Preston, Carl Denham's assistant in King Kong (2005)

== See also ==
- Preston (surname)
