= James Preston =

James Preston may refer to:

- James H. Preston (1860–1938), mayor of Baltimore
- James Moore Preston (1873–1962), American painter and illustrator
- James Patton Preston (1774–1843), U.S. political figure
- James Rhea Preston (1853–1922), American educator in Mississippi
- James Preston (cricketer) (1792–1842), English cricketer
- James B. Preston (politician) (died 1902), American politician
- James B. Preston (1926–2004), American neurophysiologist
- James Preston (runner) (born 1997), track and field athlete from New Zealand

== See also ==
- Jimmy Preston (1913–1984), R&B bandleader
