= Senator Preston =

Senator Preston may refer to:

- Francis Preston (1765–1835), Virginia State Senate
- James Patton Preston (1774–1843), Virginia State Senate
- Jean R. Preston (1935–2013), North Carolina State Senate
- John S. Preston (1809–1881), South Carolina State Senate
- Platt A. Preston (1837–1900), Washington State Senate
- William Ballard Preston (1805–1862), Confederate States Senator from Virginia in 1862
- William C. Preston (1794–1860), U.S. Senator from South Carolina from 1833 to 1842
