= George Preston =

George Preston may refer to:

- George Preston (British Army officer, died 1748) (c. 1659–1748), Scottish army officer, known for his involvement in the Jacobite risings
- George Preston (British Army officer, died 1785) (1707–1785), led the Royal Scots Greys
- George Dawson Preston (1896–1972), British physicist
- George Henry Preston (1911–2003), British gardener
- George Nelson Preston (born 1938), artist and scholar of African art
