= Joseph Preston =

Joseph Preston may refer to:

- Joe Preston (politician) (born 1955), Canadian politician
- Joe Preston (musician) (born 1969), American bassist
  - Joe Preston (EP), 1992
- Joseph Preston (cricketer) (1864–1890), English cricketer
- Joseph Preston Jr. (born 1947), American politician from Pennsylvania
- Joseph E. Preston (born 1956), American politician from Virginia
