= Robert Preston =

Robert Preston may refer to:

- Robert Preston (actor) (1918–1987), American actor
- Robert Preston (military lawyer)
- Robert Preston (American politician) (1929–2021), American politician, New Hampshire State Senator
- Robert Preston, 1st Baron Gormanston (died 1396), Anglo-Irish nobleman, statesman and judge
- Robert Preston (Westmorland MP), British MP for Westmorland, 1421
- Robert Preston, 1st Viscount Gormanston (1435–1503), Irish politician
- Sir Robert Preston, 6th Baronet (1740–1834), Scottish merchant and MP for Dover and Cirencester
- Robert E. Preston (1836–1911), Director of the U.S. Mint, 1893–98
- Robert K. Preston (1953–2009), White House intruder
- Robert Henry Preston (1840–1926), Ontario doctor and political figure
- Rob Preston (born 1982), American professional basketball player
- Robert Preston (Coronation Street), fictional character in the British TV soap opera Coronation Street

== See also ==
- Robert Peston (born 1960), political editor for ITV News, and former business editor for BBC News
