= Corderman =

Corderman is a surname. Notable people with the surname include:

- John P. Corderman (1942–2012), American politician
- Paul Corderman (born 1971), American politician
- Preston Corderman (died 1998), United States Army general
