= Effa =

Effa may refer to:

== People ==
=== Surname ===
- Gaston-Paul Effa (born 1965), Cameroonian writer and philosophy professor
- Karel Effa (1922–1993) Czech actor
- Andre Akono Effa, Cameroonian footballer (see Astres FC)

=== Given name ===
- Effa Manley (1897–1981), American sports executive
- Effa Muhse (1877–1968), American biologist
- Effa Ellis Perfield (1873–1967), American educator
- Effa E. Preston (1884–1975), American educator, playwright, poet

== Other uses ==
- Effa Motors, Uruguayan automotive company
- One of the mascots of the Newark Bears
- European Flavour Association (abbreviated EFFA)

== See also ==
- Effie
