= United States Army Security Agency =

Signals intelligence branch of the United States Army (1945–1976)

Army Security Agency
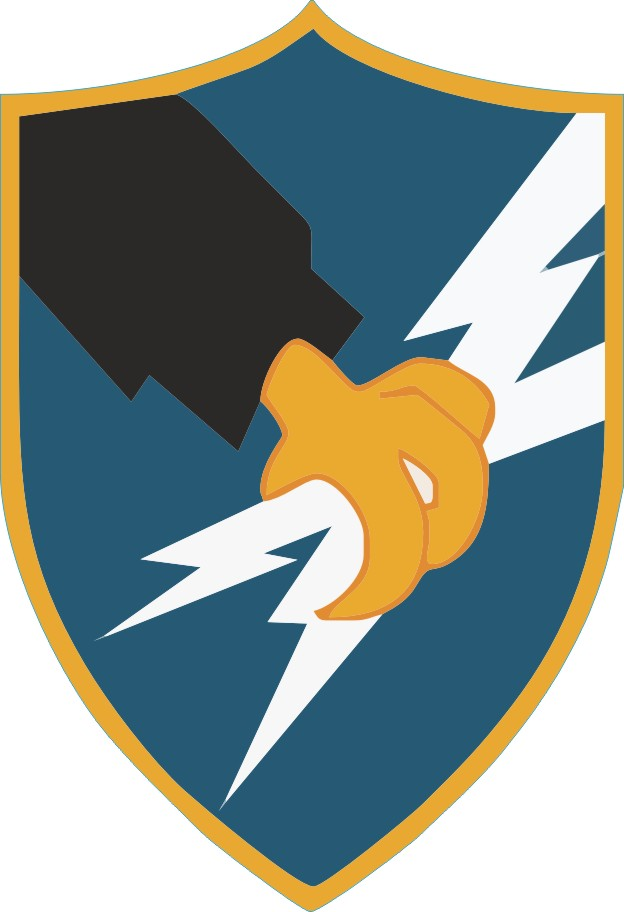
- Army Security Agency Shoulder Sleeve Insignia
- Active: 1945 – 1977
- Disbanded: 1977 (49 years ago)
- Country: United States
- Branch: United States Army
- Role: Communications Intelligence; Electronic Intelligence; Signals Intelligence; Communications Security
- Part of: National Security Agency
- Garrison/HQ: Arlington Hall Station, Virginia
- Mottos: Semper Vigiles; Vigilant Always

Insignia
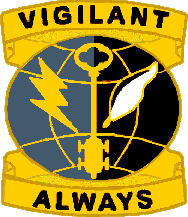
- Distinctive unit insignia

The United States Army Security Agency (ASA) was the United States Army's signals intelligence branch from 1945 to 1987. The Latin motto of the Army Security Agency was Semper Vigilis (Vigilant Always), which echoes the declaration, often mistakenly attributed to Thomas Jefferson, that "The price of liberty is eternal vigilance."

Although most ASA units focused upon SIGINT (signals intelligence) most if not all ASA units contained HUMINT (human intelligence) specialists as well, mostly interrogators and counter-intelligence specialists. At the end of the Cold War era, some ASA units also were staffed with ELINT (electronic intelligence) specialists and warrant officers, which incorporated field ECM (electronic counter-measures) and field ECCM (electronic counter-countermeasures) such as tactical jammers, direction finders, electronic signal decoys, and captured/repurposed Warsaw Pact radio and communications equipment.

The Agency existed between 1945 and 1977 and was the successor to the Army Signals Intelligence Service, operations that dated to World War I. ASA was under the operational control of the director of the National Security Agency (DIRNSA), located at Fort Meade, Maryland. It had its own tactical commander at Headquarters, ASA, at Arlington Hall Station, Virginia. Besides intelligence gathering, it had responsibility for the security of Army communications and for electronic countermeasures operations. In 1977, the ASA was merged with the US Army's Military Intelligence component to create the United States Army Intelligence and Security Command (INSCOM). The last ASA field unit was the 407th ASA Company attached to the 3rd Armored Cavalry Regiment inactivated 15 NOV 1982 at Fort Bliss, Texas. However the 523rd ASA based out of Fort Snelling, Minnesota was active until 1987, when it was deactivated and reformed as the 147th MI Bn (CEWI) under the 88th USARCOM.

== History ==
Composed of soldiers trained in radio communication, cryptography, military intelligence and linguists trained at the Defense Language Institute located at the Presidio of Monterey, California, the ASA was tasked with monitoring and interpreting military communications of the Soviet Union, the People's Republic of China, and their allies and client states around the world. The agency was established after World War II, when the Soviet Union and the US had been allies. In the postwar years, after the Soviet Union and communist governments gained power in eastern Europe and China, they became enemies in the Cold War between Communist states and allies, and the US and western nations. The ASA was directly subordinate to the National Security Agency, and all major field stations had NSA technical representatives present.

All gathered information had time-sensitive value, depending on its importance and classification. Information was passed through intelligence channels within hours of intercept for the lowest-priority items, but in as little as 10 minutes for the most highly critical information.

ASA personnel were stationed at locations around the globe, wherever the United States had a military presence. They were sometimes publicly acknowledged. In some cases, such as in Asmara, Eritrea Ethiopia East Africa they constituted the primary US military presence. Other sites included Chitose, Japan; Sinop, Turkey; Kagnew Station, Ethiopia, and the Panama Canal Zone. A former field station outside Harrogate, England, in what is now North Yorkshire, was a primary listening post that the US turned over to the British in the postwar years. They adapted it as a Royal Air Force (RAF) station. It is called RAF Menwith Hill and has been the site of peace protests. There was also a listening post set up at Schneeberg Mountain, Germany. The 502nd Army Security Agency Group was posted at Flak Kaserne in Augsburg, West Germany, during the Cold War. The 502nd and its listening post near Gablingen, Germany, gathered information from communications across Eastern Europe and the Soviet Union.

During the height of the Cold War, personnel from the 326 ASA Company stationed at Ft. Bragg, North Carolina, relocated classified mobile communications equipment to Homestead Air Force Base in Miami–Dade County, Florida. In 1962, they developed the precursor to the 6th USASA Field Station (Seminole Station). U.S. overflights photographed and discovered offensive nuclear weapons placed in Cuba by Soviet allies. Cuba became a live mission before, during and after the Cuban Missile Crisis. The US forced the Soviet Union to remove the weapons.

The perception of the last ASAs being shuttered after the end of the Vietnam War is incorrect. In addition to the 407th ASA at Fort Bliss, deactivated in 1982, the last ASA was the 523rd based out of Fort Snelling, Minnesota. In late 1987, the 523rd was deactivated and was reformed as the 147th MI Bn (CEWI.)

=== Vietnam War ===
On 13 May 1961, the 92 personnel of the 3rd Radio Research Unit (3rd RRU), the cover name for the 400th USASA Operations Unit (Provisional) arrived at Tan Son Nhut Air Base, near Saigon. Its deployment marked the first time that an entire Army unit had deployed to South Vietnam, previously, individuals had been assigned to the Army's advisory group individually. The unit established its headquarters in an empty warehouse on the base. Within two days of arrival, the 3rd RRU had operations up and running.

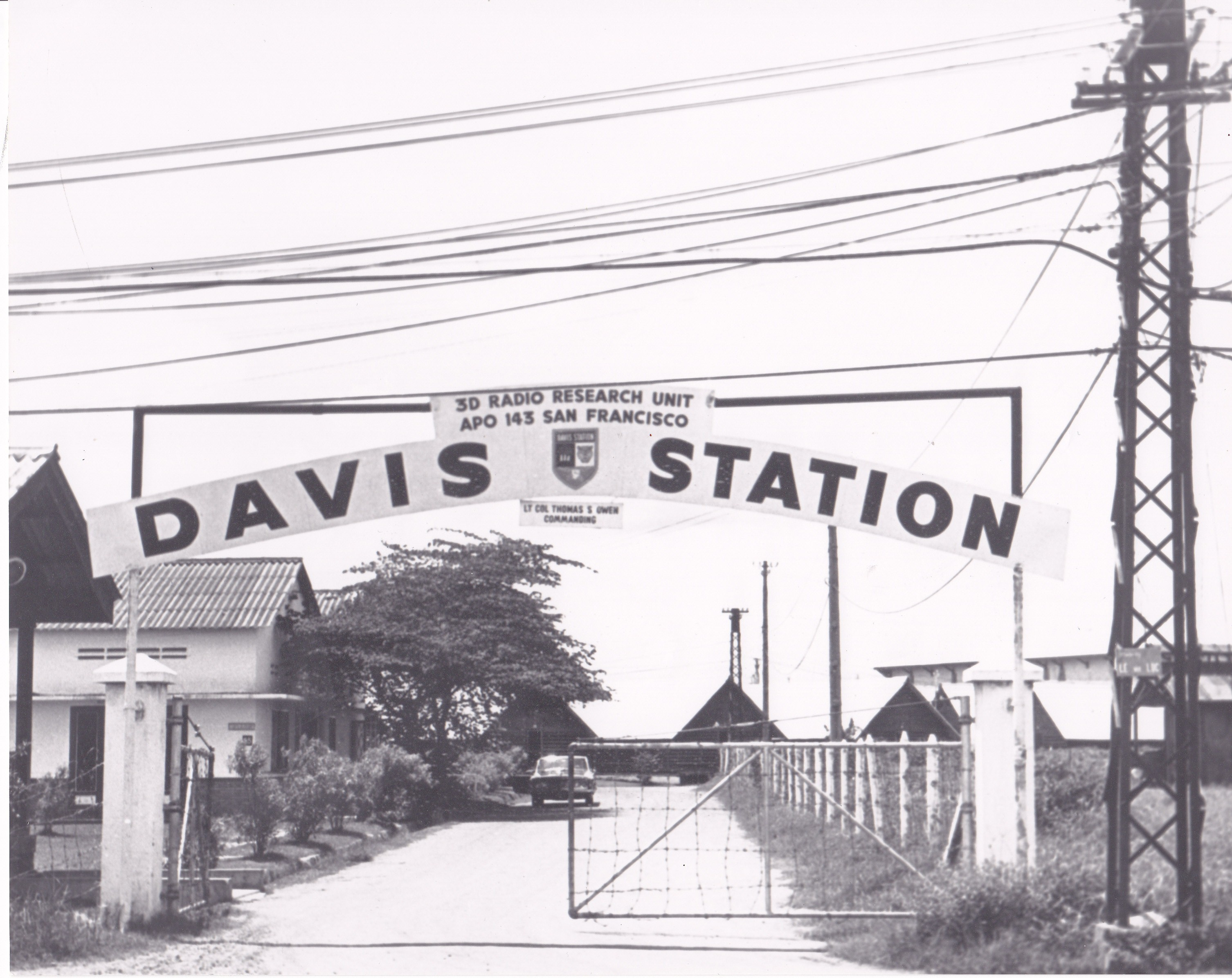
Davis Station entrance

The first ASA soldier to be killed in action was Specialist 4 James T. Davis, killed on 22 December 1961, on a road near the old French garrison of Cau Xang northwest of Saigon. Davis Station, at Tan Son Nhut, was named after him.

The 3rd RRU continued to grow in numbers in response to expanded requirements. A mobile detachment was established at Da Nang, manned by 21 officers, four warrant officers, and 356 enlisted men. When the mobile detachment relocated to Phu Bai Airfield, even closer to the northern border, it became known as Detachment J. Phu Bai became a second permanent base for air operations.

By mid-1965, ASA had a total of 1,487 personnel distributed among three units: the 3rd RRU, the 7th RRU, and the 8th RRU. The 3rd RRU served as the command element over all three. However, over the next nine months, the creation of direct support units forced the 3rd RRU Commander into the untenable position of having to divide his attention between his own operational mission and ensuring that the direct support units were meeting the needs of their field commands. Therefore, ASA discontinued the 3rd RRU on 1 June 1966 and redistributed its mission and resources among four new organizations under the administrative control of the 509th Radio Research Group. Within six years of the 3rd RRU's initial arrival, ASA's in-country strength would be nearly 6,000 personnel, divided into 20 to 30 units that were further broken down into detachments and teams located at remote sites and fire support bases. At any given time more than 100 such elements could be scattered throughout South Vietnam, all commanded by the 509th Radio Research Group.

ASA personnel were attached to Army infantry and armored cavalry units throughout the war. Some teams were also attached to Special Forces units. Assigned to the 5th Special Forces Group based out of Nha Trang was the 403rd Radio Research Group, Special Operations Detachment (SOD). SOD forces were deployed to Operational Detachment base camps throughout South Vietnam. Other teams, such as the 313th Radio Research Battalion at Nha Trang, were independent of other Army units. The 313th had a number of 30 man detachments, tasked to monitor enemy communications and locations.

The 509th RR Group was discontinued on 7 March 1973 ending ASA's 12-year service in South Vietnam.

== Chiefs ==
Here is the list of Chiefs of U.S. Army Security Agency:

- BG Preston Corderman (September 1945 - March 1946)
- COL Harold G. Hayes (April 1946 - January 1949)
- BG Carter W. Clarke (January 1949 - May 1950)
- BG William N. Gillmore (August 1950 - February 1951)
- MG Robinson E. Duff (August 1951 - December 1952)
- MG Harry Reichelderfer (January 1953 - June 1956)
- BG Samuel P. Collins (June 1956 - July 1956)
- MG James H. Phillips (August 1956 - July 1958)
- MG Thomas S. Timberman (July 1958 - March 1960)
- MG William M. Breckinridge (April 1960 - May 1962)
- MG William H. Craig (July 1962 - September 1965)
- MG Charles J. Denholm (September 1965 - February 1973)
- MG George A. Godding (March 1973 - August 1975)
- MG William I. Rolya (September 1975 - December 1976)
