= Smithfield (Blacksburg, Virginia) =

Historic house in Virginia, United States

- U.S. National Register of Historic Places
- Virginia Landmarks Register
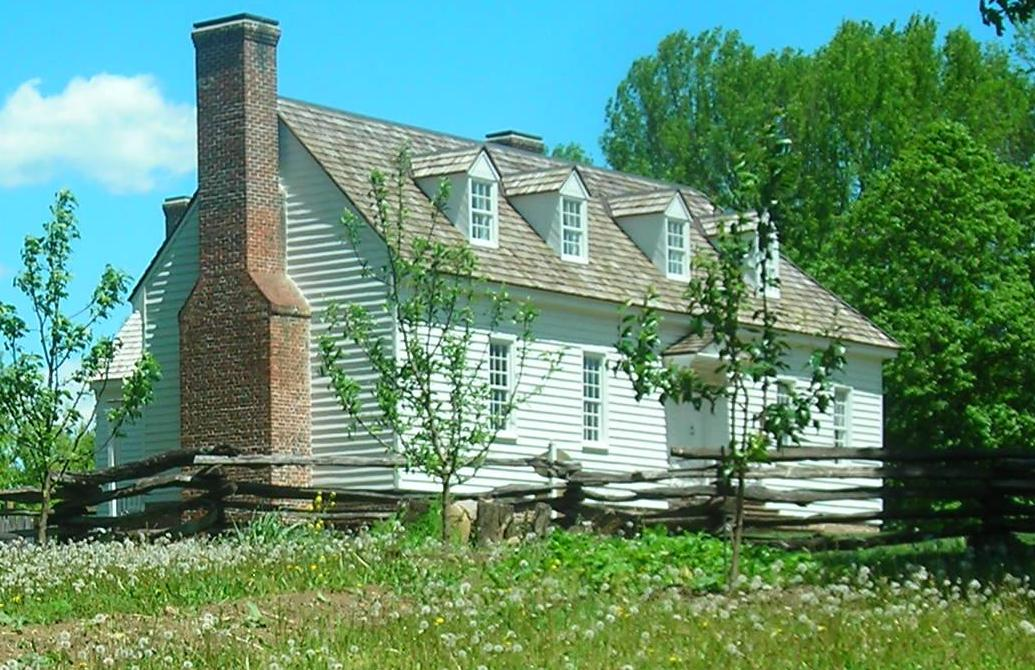
- Smithfield Plantation

- Location within Virginia Location within the United States
- Location: 1000 Smithfield Plantation Rd, Blacksburg, Virginia
- Coordinates: 37°13′04″N 80°25′55″W
- Area: 4.5 acres (1.8 ha)
- Built: 1773
- Architectural style: Colonial
- NRHP reference No.: 69000261
- VLR No.: 150-5017

Significant dates
- Added to NRHP: November 12, 1969
- Designated VLR: November 5, 1968

Smithfield is a plantation house in Blacksburg, Virginia, built from 1772 to 1774 by Col. William Preston to be his residence and the headquarters of his farm. It was the birthplace of two Virginia Governors: James Patton Preston and John B. Floyd. The house remained a family home until 1959 when the home was donated to the APVA.

== History ==
The plantation site was part of 120,000 acres originally granted to James Patton by the British Crown. Patton was killed in the Draper's Meadow massacre in July 1755. The property was purchased by Patton's nephew, William Preston, who built the house from 1773 to 1774. Preston was an important colonial political figure, and may have been the author of the Fincastle Resolutions. He remained on the property, despite frequent threats from nearby Tories and Loyalists and Native Americans and the disruptions of the American Revolutionary War until his death from a stroke at a 1783 local militia muster.

The property then passed to his wife, Susanna Smith Preston, who lived there until her death forty years later.

James Patton Preston, Virginia Governor, inherited the farm from his mother. It was also the birthplace and home of his son, William Ballard Preston, who worked with Abraham Lincoln in the 1840s in Congress as part of a group of legislators known as "The Young Indians" and later authored Virginia's Articles of Secession in 1861. Descendants of William and Susanna Preston included four Virginia Governors – James Patton Preston, John Floyd, James McDowell, and John Buchanan Floyd – and numerous other legislators. In addition, descendants were instrumental in the founding and growth of several universities, including Virginia Military Institute, Virginia Tech and University of South Carolina.

The house itself is L-shaped, with high ceilings and large rooms. The detailing and proportions of the house are unusual for frontier homes. More unusually, the master bedroom is placed between the parlor and the dining room on the first floor, implying that Preston wanted to impress his guests with his ornate bedroom furniture.

== Preservation ==
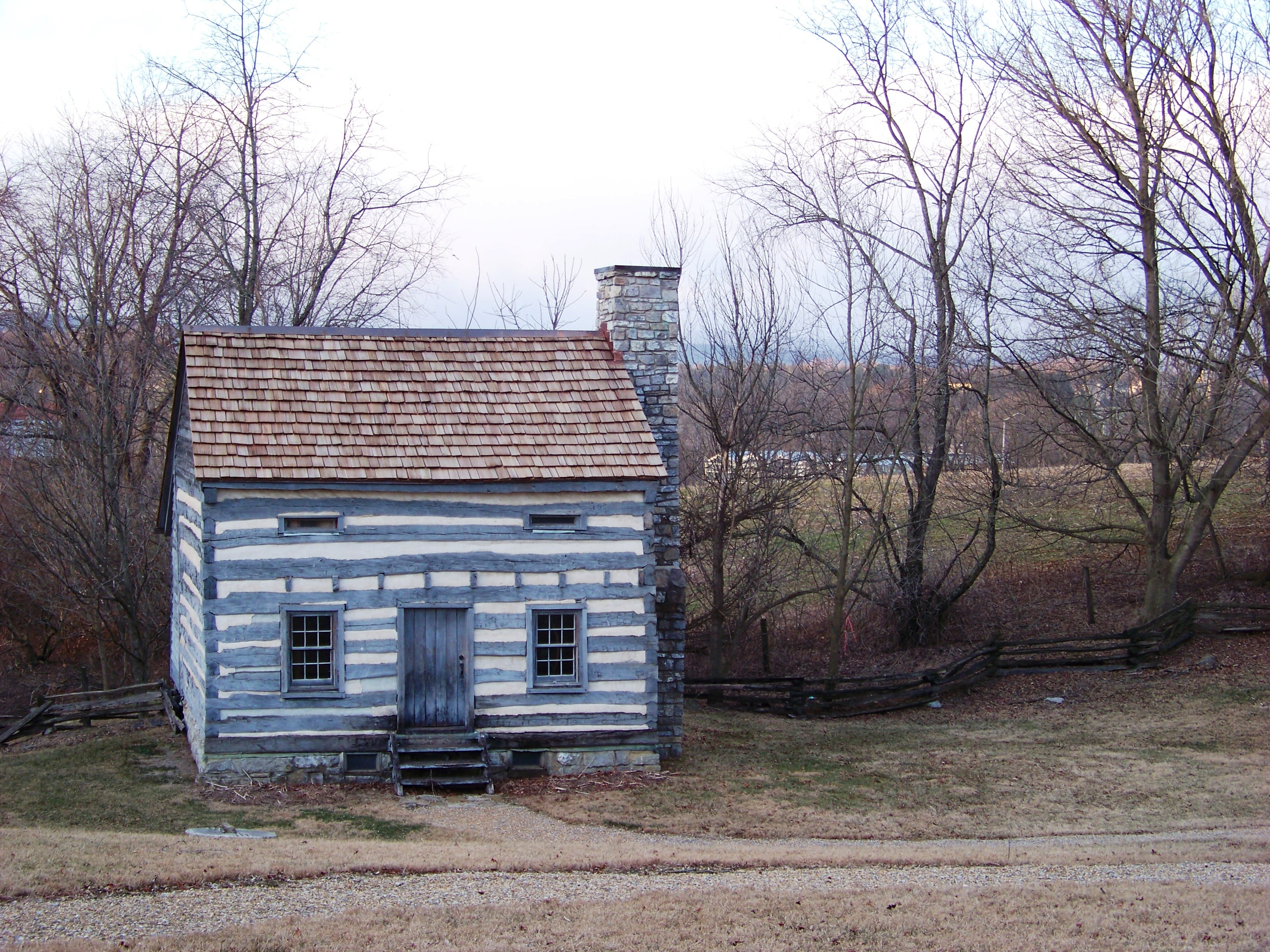
Reconstructed 18th-century pioneer cabin on Smithfield Plantation.

Preservation Virginia acquired the property in 1959 as a gift from Janie Preston Boulware Lamb, a descendant of Revolutionary War Patriot leader Colonel William Preston. With help from Preservation Virginia and the Virginia Daughters of the American Revolution, the property was restored and opened to the public in 1964. The rooms of the house are furnished with eighteenth and nineteenth century Decorative arts furniture, portraits and other items, while the basement level Museum contains a variety of artifacts found on-site, including Native American relics. The landscape includes an eighteenth-century kitchen garden tended by volunteers. The plantation is open for tours April through the first week in December.
