= Justice Preston =

Justice Preston may refer to:

- Byron W. Preston (1858–1939), associate justice of the Iowa Supreme Court
- Edward Preston (1831–1890), justice of the Supreme Court of the Kingdom of Hawaii
- Isaac Trimble Preston (1793–1852), associate justice of the Louisiana Supreme Court
- John W. Preston (1877–1958), associate justice of the Supreme Court of California

== See also ==
- Gilbert of Preston (1209–1274), chief justice of the Common Pleas in the United Kingdom
