= Prestin (surname) =

Prestin is a surname. Notable people with the surname include:

- David Prestin, American politician
- Dieter Prestin (born 1956), German footballer

== See also ==
- Preston (surname)
- Prestin Ryan
