= Thomas Preston =

Thomas Preston may refer to:

== Politicians ==
- Thomas Preston (MP for Derby), see Derby
- Thomas Preston (died 1604), MP for Knaresborough
- Thomas Preston of Gretton, MP for Northampton
- Thomas Preston (MP for Newcastle-under-Lyme), in 1437 MP for Newcastle-under-Lyme
- Thomas Preston, in 1452 MP for Wallingford
- Thomas Preston (of Holker, elder) (1600–1679), English MP for Lancashire
- Thomas Preston (of Holker, younger) (1647–1697), English MP for Lancaster
- Thomas Hiram Preston (1855–1925), Ontario journalist and political figure
- Thomas Hildebrand Preston (1886–1976), British diplomat

== Religion ==
- Thomas Preston (monk) (1563–1640), English Benedictine monk
- Thomas Scott Preston (1824–1891), Roman Catholic Vicar General of New York

== Others ==
- Thomas Preston (composer) (died c. 1563), English composer
- Thomas Preston (footballer) (1893–1971), Scottish footballer (Airdrieonians)
- Thomas Preston (writer) (1537–1598), master of Trinity Hall, Cambridge and possible author of King Cambyses
- Thomas Preston, 1st Viscount Tara (1585–1655), who fought on the side of Confederation in the Irish Confederate Wars (1642–1649)
- Thomas Preston (British Army officer), involved in the Boston Massacre in 1770
- Thomas Austin Preston, Jr. (1928–2012), poker player also known as Amarillo Slim
- Thomas Preston (scientist) (1860–1900), Irish scientist
- Thomas J. Preston Jr. (1862–1955), professor of archeology at Princeton University
- Tommy Preston (1932–2015), Scottish footballer (Hibernian)
- Tom Preston-Werner (born 1979), American entrepreneur (GitHub)
