= Oregon Bill of 1848 =

The Oregon Bill of 1848, officially titled when approved, "An Act to Establish the Territorial Government of Oregon," was an act of Congress to turn Oregon into an official U.S. Territory. The bill was passed on August 14, 1848. It was enacted by the 30th United States Congress, and signed by President James K. Polk. The bill came into question several years after the Oregon Treaty. For two years following that treaty, the United States paid little attention to it until news of the Whitman massacre reached Congress. This provided the impetus to formally establish the Territorial Government of Oregon. The Act created a territory that encompassed present-day Idaho, Oregon, and Washington; as well as parts of Montana and Wyoming.

The original version of the bill, with an amendment to prohibit slavery, was approved by the United States House of Representatives by a vote of 140–59 on February 3, 1845.
