= Attorney General Preston =

Attorney General Preston may refer to:

- Douglas A. Preston (1858–1929), Attorney General of Wyoming
- Edward Preston (1831–1890), Attorney General of the Kingdom of Hawaii
- Isaac Trimble Preston (1793–1852), Attorney General of Louisiana

== See also ==
- General Preston (disambiguation)
