= Augustus A. Chapman =

American politician (1805–1876)

Member of the U.S. House of Representatives from Virginia's 12th district
- In office March 4, 1843 – March 3, 1847
- Preceded by: Thomas W. Gilmer
- Succeeded by: William B. Preston

Member of the Virginia House of Delegates from Monroe County
- In office December 7, 1857 – December 2, 1861
- Preceded by: Alexander D. Haynes
- Succeeded by: John M. Rowan
- In office December 2, 1839 – December 6, 1841
- Preceded by: James A. Dunlap
- Succeeded by: Allen T. Caperton
- In office December 7, 1835 – January 7, 1839
- Preceded by: Henry Alexander
- Succeeded by: James A. Dunlap

Personal details
- Born: March 9, 1805 Union, Virginia, U.S. (now West Virginia)
- Died: June 7, 1876 (aged 71) Hinton, West Virginia, U.S.
- Party: Democratic
- Spouse: Mary Rankin Beirne

Augustus Alexandria Chapman (March 9, 1805 – June 7, 1876) was a 19th-century politician and lawyer from Virginia. Chapman served several terms in the Virginia House of Delegates, as well as one term in the United States House of Representatives. He was also elected to the Virginia Constitutional Convention of 1850.

== Early life ==
Born in Union, Virginia (now West Virginia), Chapman studied law as a young adult, graduating with a Bachelor of Laws from the University of Virginia in 1827.

== Career ==
He was admitted to the bar in 1825 and commenced practice in Union, Virginia.

About 1829, Chapman settled in Monroe County, Virginia. He was a member of the Virginia House of Delegates from 1835 to 1841.

Chapman was later elected a Democrat to the United States House of Representatives, serving two terms from 1843 to 1847.

Chapman was a member of the Virginia Constitutional Convention from 1850 to 1851 and later returned to the House of Delegates from 1857 to 1861.

At the outbreak of the Civil War, Chapman became a brigadier general of the Virginia Militia and as such took the field with his command in 1861. He was in charge of the 19th Brigade, which consisted of six regiments from Raleigh, Mercer, Fayette, Monroe, and Giles counties.

== Later life ==
After the war, he resumed practicing law in his hometown and engaged in agricultural pursuits.

== Death ==
Augustus Alexandria Chapman died on June 7, 1876, in Hinton, West Virginia. He is interred at Green Hill Cemetery in Union, West Virginia.

== See also ==
- List of American Civil War generals (Acting Confederate)

== Bibliography ==
- "Biographical Directory of the United States Congress, 1774 - Present". bioguide.congress.gov. United States Congress.
- Allardice, Bruce S. (1995). More Generals in Gray. Baton Rouge, LA: Louisiana State University Press. p. 287. ISBN 978-0-8071-3148-0.
- Eicher, John H.; Eicher, David J. (June 2002), Civil War High Commands, Stanford, CA: Stanford University Press (published 2001), ISBN 978-0-8047-3641-1
- Pulliam, David Loyd (1901). The Constitutional Conventions of Virginia from the foundation of the Commonwealth to the present time. John T. West, Richmond. ISBN 978-1-2879-2059-5.
- Swem, Earl Greg (1918). A Register of the General Assembly of Virginia, 1776-1918, and of the Constitutional Conventions. David Bottom, Superintendent of Public Printing. ISBN 978-1-3714-6242-0.

U.S. House of Representatives
Preceded by Thomas W. Gilmer	Member of the U.S. House of Representatives from Virginia's 12th congressional district March 4, 1843 – March 3, 1847 (obsolete district)	Succeeded by William B. Preston
