= George L. Preston =

American politician

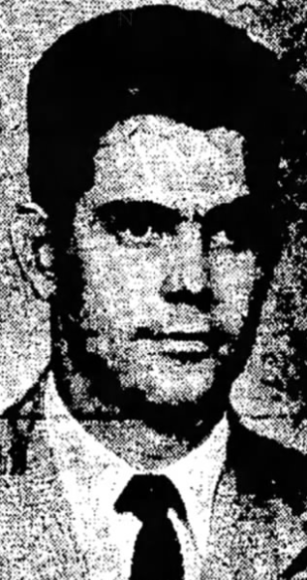
- Preston in 1958

Member of the Texas House of Representatives from the 10th district
- In office January 13, 1959 – January 8, 1963

Member of the Texas House of Representatives from the 9th district
- In office January 9, 1973 – January 11, 1977

Personal details
- Born: 1929 or 1930 (age 96–97)
- Party: Democratic
- Children: 1

George L. Preston (born 1929/1930) (Note: Preston was 46 in 1976) is an American politician. He served as a Democratic member for the 9th and 10th district of the Texas House of Representatives.
