= Roell Preston =

American football player (born 1972)

No. 85, 88, 15, 84, 82, 87
- Position: Wide receiver Return specialist

Personal information
- Born: June 23, 1972 (age 54); Miami, Florida, U.S.
- Listed height: 5 ft 10 in (1.78 m)
- Listed weight: 187 lb (85 kg)

Career information
- High school: Hialeah (Hialeah, Florida)
- College: Northwest Mississippi CC; Mississippi
- NFL draft: 1995: 5th round, 145th overall pick

Career history
- Atlanta Falcons (1995–1996); Green Bay Packers (1997); Washington Redskins (1997); Green Bay Packers (1998); Tennessee Titans (1999); Miami Dolphins (1999); San Francisco 49ers (1999); Chicago Enforcers (2001); Saskatchewan Roughriders (2001)

Awards and highlights
- All-Pro (1998); Pro Bowl (1998)

Career NFL statistics
- Receptions: 30
- Receiving yards: 360
- Return yards: 3,896
- Total touchdowns: 5
- Stats at Pro Football Reference

Roell Preston (born June 23, 1972) is an American former professional football player who was a wide receiver and return specialist in the National Football League (NFL). He was selected by the Atlanta Falcons in the fifth round of the 1995 NFL draft. A 5-foot 10-inch, 187-pound receiver from the University of Mississippi, Preston played in five NFL seasons from 1995 to 1999 for the Falcons, the Green Bay Packers, the Miami Dolphins, the San Francisco 49ers, and the Tennessee Titans. He was a 1998 Pro Bowl selection as a member of the Packers, mainly used as a kickoff and punt return specialist. He is currently living in the North Miami area.

== Early life ==
Having grown up in the troubled Lincoln Fields Apartment complex of North Miami, Preston attended Hialeah High School in Hialeah, Florida and was a letterman in football and track. After some initial struggles as a high school freshman, Preston began training in earnest as a sophomore. As a junior, he was a second-team All-Dade County selection in football. As a senior, he was a first-team All-Dade County selection. All three years at Hialeah High Preston donned jersey number 2.

== College career ==
Preston started at Northwest Mississippi Community College, but soon transferred to the University of Mississippi to play for the Ole Miss Rebels as a wide receiver. At Northwest he majored in criminal justice and excelled in football. As a sophomore he caught 58 passes for a total of 1,026 yards. He then led the team with 35 receptions for a total of 455 yards. During his senior year, he was chosen as the Super Sleeper Team choice by The Poor Man's Guide to the NFL Draft.

== Professional career ==
Preston played four years in the NFL for several different teams, used mostly as a returner on special teams. His best season was in 1998, when he racked up 1,497 yards returning kickoffs and 1,918 all-purpose yards. He also set a Packers franchise record in the playoffs with 198 kickoff return yards in their loss to the San Francisco 49ers. Preston finished his career with 4,256 total yards and 5 touchdowns.

Preston also played in the Canadian Football League and XFL in 2001.

== Personal ==
His brother, Rock Preston, played in the CFL and was a teammate with Roell on the Saskatchewan Roughriders.
