= General Preston =

General Preston may refer to:

- John F. Preston (1872–1960), U.S. Army major general
- John S. Preston (1809–1881), Confederate States Army brigadier general
- Maurice A. Preston (1912–1983), U.S. Air Force four-star general
- Thomas Preston, 1st Viscount Tara (1585–1655), Irish mercenary general
- William Preston (Kentucky soldier) (1816–1887), Confederate States Army brigadier general

== See also ==
- Attorney General Preston (disambiguation)
