= Rock Preston =

American gridiron football player (born 1975)

Profile
- Position: Running back

Personal information
- Born: March 26, 1975 (age 51); Miami, Florida, U.S.
- Listed height: 5 ft 8 in (1.73 m)
- Listed weight: 180 lb (82 kg)

Career information
- College: Florida State

Career history
- 1998–2000: Calgary Stampeders
- 2001: Saskatchewan Roughriders

Awards and highlights
- National champion (1993)

Career statistics
- Rushing yards: 853
- Touchdowns: 5

Rock Preston (born March 26, 1975) is an American former professional football running back in the Canadian Football League (CFL). He played for the Calgary Stampeders and Saskatchewan Roughriders. He played college football at Florida State.

His brother, Roell Preston, was a teammate on Saskatchewan and also played in the National Football League.
