= Frederick George Preston =

British gardener (1862–1964)

Frederick George Preston (23 July 1882 – 8 January 1964) was a British gardener, the Superintendent at Cambridge University Botanic Garden from 1919 to 1947.

== Early life ==
Preston was born at Warborough, South Oxfordshire. He was in service as a domestic gardener in his local area for eight years.

== Career ==
In 1904, he entered Kew Gardens as a student-gardener, where he remained until 1909. He then worked at Cambridge Botanic Garden, being appointed the first Superintendent (previously the position was "Curator") in 1919, supporting the Director, first Richard Irwin Lynch, then Humphrey Gilbert-Carter for nearly thirty years in a "happy partnership". He was active in many horticultural societies, such as the Royal Horticultural Society and Alpine Garden Society, as well as external examiner at Wisley and judge at flower shows. He contributed several articles for horticultural periodicals such as The Gardeners' Chronicle. He published a history of the University Botanic Garden in 1940.

Preston was awarded an Honorary Master of Arts on his retirement in 1947. The Royal Horticultural Society appointed him Association of Honour in 1936 and awarded him the Victoria Medal of Honour in Horticulture in 1938.

He was President of the Kew Guild from 1949-1950, and first President of the Cambridge University Botanic Garden Association in 1952.

== Publications ==
- The Greenhouse (1951) Ward, Lock and Co.

== Personal life ==
He married Ada Viner (1887-1968) in 1910 at St Anne's Church, Kew. They had two sons- one George Henry Preston- and a daughter. Having suffered from ill-health for some years, he died at his home in Shelford near Cambridge on 8 January 1964.
