= Anne E. Preston =

American economist (born 1955)

- Born: June 17, 1955 (age 71); Greenwich, Connecticut, United States

Academic work
- Institutions: Haverford College
- Awards: Drucker Prize for Best Paper in Nonprofit Management and Leadership (1991); Undergraduate Thesis Award, Princeton University, Department of Economics (1977)

Anne E. Preston (born June 17, 1955) is an economist and currently a professor at Haverford College, Pennsylvania, where she teaches Economics courses including Econometrics, Macroeconomics, Women in the Labor Market and Sports Economics. Preston's focus is on career opportunities for scientists and engineers and more broadly on the gender differences.

== Life ==
Born in Greenwich, Connecticut, Preston graduated summa cum laude from Princeton University in 1977 with a bachelor's degree in Economics and was granted the Undergraduate Thesis Award. She then went on to pursue her master's degree at Harvard University Graduate School of Arts and Sciences, followed by Ph.D. in economics with special fields in labor economics and industrial organization in 1983.

She married Casey Ichniowski, an economist at Columbia Business School, in 1984, and they had three children together. Ichniowski died in 2014. The couple collaborated in conducting a study titled "Does March Madness Lead to Irrational Exuberance in the NBA Draft? High-Value Employee Selection Decisions and Decision-Making Bias" in 2012.

== Career ==
She served eight years (1992–2000) as the associate professor at Harriman School for Public Policy and Management at Stony Brook University where she taught economics, business and public policy courses to undergraduate as well as graduate students. Around the same time, she was also the Director of Evaluation at WISE (Women in Science and Engineering), a program that aimed at increasing the engagement of women in the fields of science and engineering. Her presence at the Russell Sage Foundation as the visiting scholar was a great contribution to the organization that helps in the funding of research related to income inequality.

== Awards ==
- 1977 Undergraduate Thesis Award, Princeton University, Department of Economics
- 1991 Drucker Prize for Best Paper in Nonprofit Management and Leadership
- 2004 Leaving Science - Noteworthy Books in Industrial Relations and Labor Economics, Industrial Relations Section, Princeton University

== Selected works ==
- "Altruistic Responses to the September 11 Terrorist Attacks: Some Evidence from Dictator Games", 2005.
- "Why Have All the Women Gone? A Study of Exit of Women from the Science and Engineering Professions" 1994.
- "Efficiency, Quality, and Social Externalities in the Provision of Day Care: Comparisons of Nonprofit and For‑Profit Firms", Journal of Productivity Analysis, 1992.
- "Women in Non‑Profit Organizations: The Best Option or the Only Option," Review of Economics and Statistics, 1990.
- "The Non-profit Worker in a For-Profit World", 1989
- "The Effects of Property Rights on Labor Costs of Nonprofit Firms: An Application to the Day Care Industry", 1988.
