= List of Shiloh characters =

This is a list of characters from Shiloh by Phyllis Reynolds Naylor published in 1991.

== Characters ==
The characters in Shiloh are believable and well developed. Marty is a growing, curious, sensitive boy. Marty’s mother is compassionate and understanding, particularly when she discovers Shiloh. Ma has been suspicious because of Marty’s eating behavior and the disinterest that he has shown in spending time with his best friend, David Howard. Ray Preston is strict, yet supportive of his son. Open communication and a trusting relationship exist between all family members. Judd Travers is despicable but not beyond redemption, as is evident when he hands over the dog collar to Marty after the boy completes his twenty hours of work.

— Carol Ann Gearhart of Salem Press
- Shiloh - a shy brown and cute white Beagle who escapes from his rude former owner Judd Travers and the main protagonist of the books and films.
- Martin "Marty" Preston - an 11-year-old boy who finds Shiloh and wants to keep him. He is a son of Ray and Lou Preston and the older brother of Dara Lynn and Becky Preston. By "A Shiloh Christmas" Marty is twelve.
- Judd Travers - a drunk and rude man who owns Shiloh until the end of the book. He is cruel to his dogs and has no friends, but it's revealed that Judd's father began physically abusing Judd when he was four years old; blaming the boy for the death of his mother who died in childbirth. It also comes to light that Judd and Ray Preston once knew each other when they were Marty's age, but their parents kept them from each other; Judd has been afraid of reconnecting with Ray ever since, afraid the man will reject and hate him. In the end, Judd warms to Marty, opens up about his past and problems, quits drinking, relents, and lets him keep Shiloh.
- Raymond "Ray" Preston - Marty, Dara Lynn, and Becky's strict father, a mail carrier.
- Louanne "Lou" Preston - Marty, Dara Lynn, and Becky's sympathetic mother who does odd jobs from home.
- Dara Lynn Preston - Marty and Becky's 7-year-old sister. Marty and Dara Lynn don't get along, but deep down they love each other. Dara Lynn wants a cat, but her family can't afford to have one. At the end of "Saving Shiloh", Marty buys Dara Lynn a cat for her birthday. By "A Shiloh Christmas" Dara Lynn is eight years old.
- Rebecca "Becky" Preston - Marty and Dara Lynn's 3-year-old sister. By "A Shiloh Christmas" Becky is four years old.
- David Howard - Marty's best friend.
- Dr. Taylor Murphy - a doctor who heals Shiloh.
- Mrs. Howard - David's mom, a teacher.
- Tangerine - Dara Lynn's cat. Marty buys Tangerine at the end of "Saving Shiloh" and gives Tangerine to Dara Lynn for her birthday.
- Mr. Wallace - a man who owns a store down in the town. In the film, Mr. Wallace's name is Doc Wallace and he and his wife take care of their granddaughter Sam Wallace after her parents die in an accident.
- Dr. Collins - a veterinarian/a doctor for animals that Marty works for.
- Mrs. Baker's Dog – a large German Shepherd dog that attacked Shiloh.
- Judith Dawes - the pastor's wife
- Rachel Dawes - one of the two daughters Pastor Dawes has, Marty's classmate.
