= Preston D. Miller =

Preston D. Miller, Jr. is a periodontist.

== Education and career ==
Miller graduated from the Virginia Commonwealth University School of Dentistry in 1963 and the University of Alabama School of Dentistry, where he received his periodontal training, in 1969.

Miller was the recipient of the 1999 Master Clinician Award from the American Academy of Periodontology. He served a one-year term of president of the American Academy of Periodontology beginning in 2006.

Miller is a clinical professor in the department of periodontics at the Medical University of South Carolina College of Dental Medicine.
