= Sally Preston =

British businessman (born 1964)

Sally Louise Preston MBE (born 1964) is a British entrepreneur and founder of the frozen babyfood company Babylicious. She is an advisor of the Conservative Party (UK) as a member of the New Enterprise Council.

== Early career ==
Preston gained a degree in Food science and then joined Marks & Spencer’s ready-meals department in the 1980s. She left in 1999 to do consultancy work, partly motivated by the need to find a better balance between her working life and motherhood.

== Babylicious ==
Preston founded Babylicious in 2001, partly because she had seen a need for high quality frozen baby food, and partly because, being newly divorced and diagnosed with skin cancer, she felt that "life’s pretty bad as it is already, what have I got to lose?"

The early years of Babylicious were notable for a series of problems, including theft of the company's name and consequent litigation, and a vendetta campaign staged by an ill-wisher who impersonated an official to make derogatory calls to Preston's customers. However her company today has a turnover of £2.5M p.a. and the value of the brand is estimated at £4M.

Preston was appointed Member of the Order of the British Empire (MBE) in the 2020 New Year Honours for services to entrepreneurship.
