= Anthony Preston =

Anthony Preston may refer to:

- Anthony Preston (record producer), American music producer and songwriter
- Antony Preston (1938–2004), British naval historian and editor
- Anthony Preston Smith, American horticulturalist and California pioneer
- Anthony "Tony" Preston, a fictional character in the film Midnight Lace
