= Joseph Preston (cricketer) =

English cricketer (1864–1890)

Joseph Merritt Preston (23 August 1864 – 26 November 1890) was an English first-class cricketer, who played for Yorkshire County Cricket Club between 1885 and 1889, in a promising career cut short by his premature demise.

Born in Yeadon, Yorkshire, England, Preston played in ninety five first-class games, taking 211 wickets with his off spin at 17.83, with his best figures 9 for 28 against the Marylebone Cricket Club (MCC). He scored 2,131 runs, with a top score of 93 against Derbyshire, at an average of 14.90.

In August 1883, he hit the 29-year-old batsman, Albert Luty, on the head with a quick delivery in a club match in Yeadon. Luty, who had been married for only nine days at the time, succumbed to the blow and was buried in Yeadon churchyard.

Coincidentally, Preston died after catching a chill at the age of 26 in Windhill, Yorkshire, and was also buried in Yeadon churchyard.
