= John T. Preston =

American venture capitalist

John T. Preston is a venture capitalist and entrepreneur who previously ran the technology licensing office at the Massachusetts Institute of Technology, best known for contributions to the energy, environment, and technology industries. During his 30 years at MIT, Preston held multiple positions mostly focused on the interface between the university and industry and entrepreneurship.

Preston was awarded the rank of Knight of the Order of National Merit of France (Ordre national du Mérite) by François Mitterrand and the Hammer Award for Reinventing Government (National Partnership for Reinventing Government by Al Gore. He also chaired George H. W. Bush's conference announcing the President's technology initiative and has testified as a technology expert seven times before Congress.

Preston has previously served as a Board Advisor to Mars, Incorporated. Preston is currently on the board of Clean Harbors, Green Cement, and Vantem Global. He was previously on the board of ExThera Medical.

Preston has also filed several patents.

== Education ==
Preston earned a BS in physics from the University of Wisconsin (1972) and a master of management degree from Northwestern University (1976).
