= Thomas Preston (died 1604) =

English politician

Thomas Preston (died 1604) was an English politician.

He was the only son of John Preston of Preston Patrick, Westmorland.

He was a Justice of the Peace for Lancashire and Westmorland and appointed High Sheriff of Lancashire for 1584–85.

He was a member (MP) of the parliament of England for Knaresborough in 1589.

He married Anne or Margaret, the daughter of John Westby of Mowbrick, Lancashire; they had one son, John.
