= William Preston (poet) =

Irish poet (1753–1807)

- Born: 1753
- Died: 1807 (aged 53–54)
- Education: Trinity College Dublin
- Occupation: Playwright
- Writing career
- Genre: Poetry

William Preston (1753 – 2 February 1807) was an Irish poet, playwright and essayist.

== Life ==
Born in the parish of St. Michan's, Dublin, he was admitted a pensioner at Trinity College Dublin in 1766. He graduated B.A. in 1770, and M.A. in 1773, studied in the Middle Temple, and was called to the Irish bar in 1777. At one point he was Commissioner of Appeals.

Preston assisted in the formation of the Royal Irish Academy, and was elected its first secretary in 1786, a post he held during the rest of his life. He also helped to found the Dublin Library Society, and was a contributor to its Transactions.

Preston, who was a member of the Monks of the Screw, died on 2 February 1807. He was buried in St. Thomas's churchyard, Dublin.

== Works ==
Preston wrote occasional poetry for periodicals—including The Press, the organ of the United Irishmen, and the Sentimental and Masonic Magazine, 1794—and he contributed to Pranceriana (1784) a collection of satirical pieces on John Hely-Hutchinson, provost of Trinity College, and to Joshua Edkins's collection of poems (1789–90 and 1801).

His main success was his tragedy Democratic Rage, based on incidents in the French Revolution. It was produced at Dublin in 1793, and ran through three editions in as many weeks. Other works were:

- Heroic Epistle of Mr. Manly … to Mr. Pinchbeck, satire (anon.), Dublin, 1775.
- Heroic Epistle to Mr. Twiss, by Donna Teresa Pinna y Ruiz, a satire, Dublin, 1775; 2nd edit. Dublin, 1775.
- Heroic Answer of Mr. Twiss, by the same, a satire, Dublin, 1775. These two works were aimed at Richard Twiss.
- 1777, or a Picture of the Manners and Customs of the Age, poem (anon.), Dublin, 1778?
- The Female Congress, or the Temple of Cottyto, mock-heroic poem in four cantos, London, 1779
- The Contrast, or a Comparison between England and Ireland, poem, 1780.
- Offa and Ethelbert, or the Saxon Princes, tragedy, Dublin, 1791.
- Messina Freed, tragedy, Dublin, 1793.
- The Adopted Son, a tragedy.
- Rosmanda, a tragedy, Dublin, 1793.
- Democratic Rage, a tragedy, London, 1793.
- Poetical Works, 2 vols. Dublin, 1793.
- The Siege of Ismail, a tragedy, Dublin, 1794.
- A Letter to Bryan Edwards, Esq. … on some Passages of his "History of the West Indies", London, 1794.
- The Natural Advantages of Ireland, Dublin, 1796.
- The Argonautics of Apollonius Rhodius, translated into English verse with notes, 1803 (various other editions).
- Some Considerations on the History of the Ancient Amatory Writers and the comparative Merits of the Elegiac Poets, Dublin? 1805?
- Posthumous Poems, edited by Hon. Frances Preston, with portrait, Dublin, 1809.

== See also ==
- Thomas Preston, 1st Viscount Tara
- William Preston (Virginia soldier)

== Notes ==
Attribution

This article incorporates text from a publication now in the public domain: Lee, Sidney, ed. (1896). "Preston, William (1753-1807)". Dictionary of National Biography. Vol. 46. London: Smith, Elder & Co.
