= Bill Preston =

American football player (1893–1954)

Profile
- Position: Tackle

Personal information
- Born: May 6, 1893; Dade County, Missouri, U.S.
- Died: December 25, 1954 (aged 61); Ghent, Ohio, U.S.
- Listed weight: 200 lb (91 kg)

Career information
- College: Missouri

Career history
- Akron Pros (1920)

Career statistics
- Games played: 1
- Games started: 0
- Stats at Pro Football Reference

William Columbus Preston (May 6, 1893 – December 25, 1954) was an American football player.

Preston was born in 1893 on a farm in Dade County, Missouri. He played college football for the University of Missouri. He played for the team in 1915 and 1916.

Preston moved to Akron, Ohio, as a cost inspector for dirigibles. He served in the Navy during World War I. After the war, he was employed in the building business in Akron. He then joined the Portage Rubber Co.

While living in Akron, he played one game of professional football for the Akron Pros of the American Professional Football Association (APFA). His one game was the opening game on October 3, 1920, against a club from Wheeling, West Virginia, that was not affiliated with the APFA. Preston appeared in the game as a substitute at the left tackle position. Preston "left the squad" after the Wheeling game.

Preston became employed by the Mutual Benefit Life Insurance Co. in 1931 and became a general agent for the company in 1936. He moved to Ghent, Ohio, in 1946. He died in 1954 after trying to extinguish a fire at his home on Christmas Day. He was age 61 when he died.
