= John B. Preston =

American surveyor

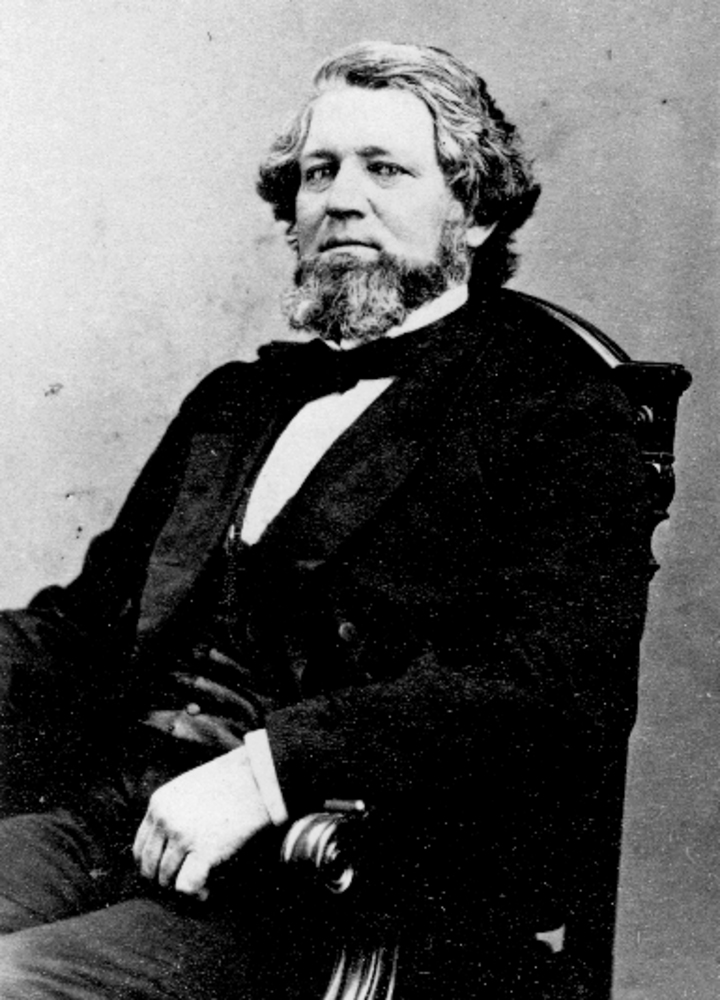
- Preston c. 1860

Surveyor General of Oregon Territory
- In office 1850–1853
- Preceded by: Position established
- Succeeded by: Charles Kitchell Gardner

Superintendent of the Illinois and Michigan Canal

Personal details
- Born: May 11, 1817 Washington County, New York, U.S.
- Died: April 13, 1865 (aged 47) Lockport Township, Illinois, U.S.
- Resting place: Lockport Cemetery; Lockport, Illinois, U.S.

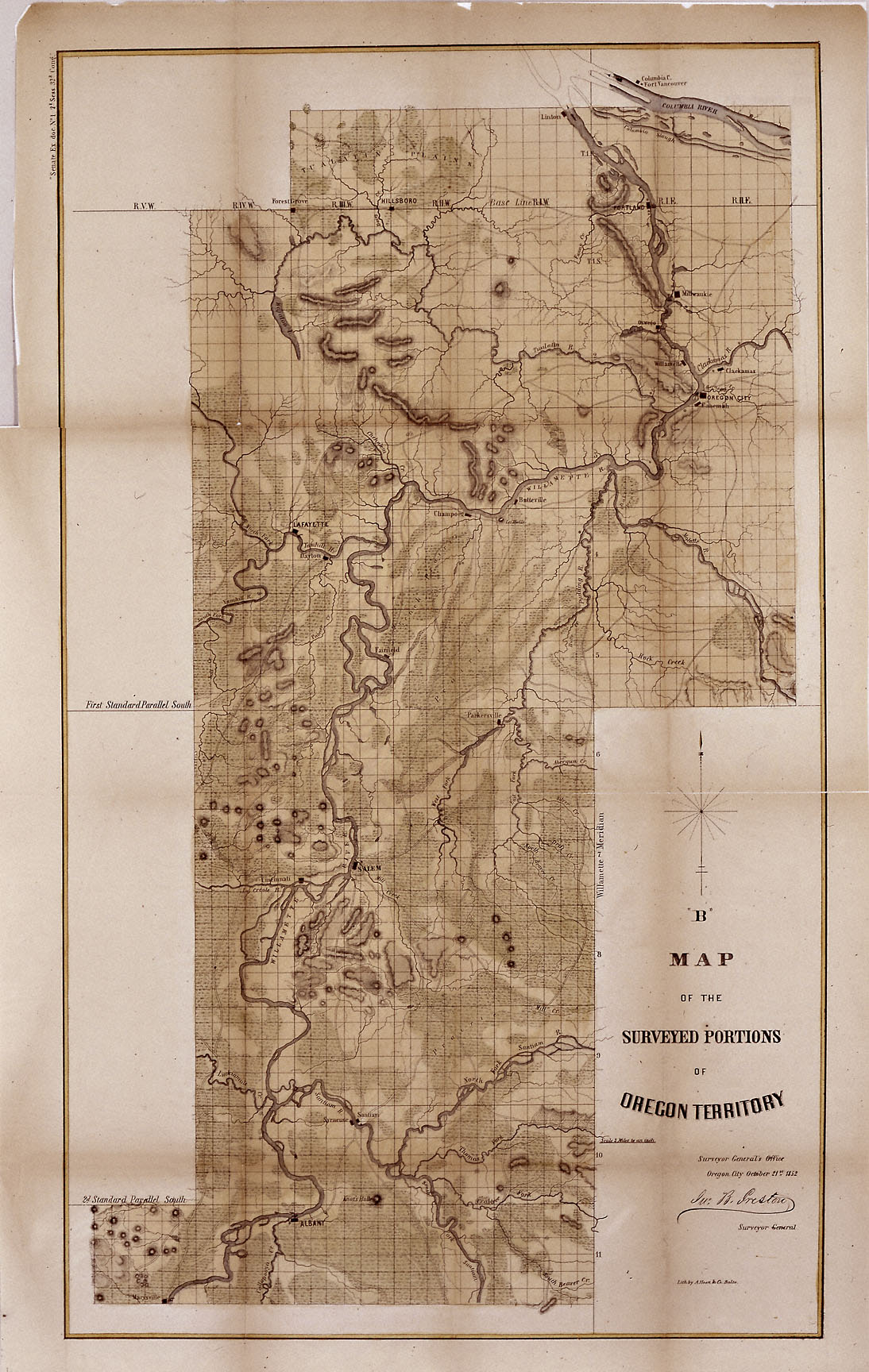
Preston's map of northwestern Oregon as of 1952.

John B. Preston (May 11, 1817 – April 13, 1865) was a civil engineer, business owner, and the first Surveyor General of the Oregon Territory in the Western United States.

== Early life ==
Preston was born in 1817 in Washington County, New York. Preston was the son of Isaac Preston, a local prominent preacher, and Betsy Walker of Granville, New York. Isaac Preston (1792 – 1883) settled in Lockport Township, Illinois in 1836, he was born in Fairfield, New Jersey in Cumberland County in 1792. While living in New York John Preston was educated in civil engineering.

== Career ==
Preston moved to Will County, Illinois in 1837 with his father where he worked as an assistant engineer on the southern portions of the Illinois and Michigan Canal in Will County. In 1850 at the age of 33 Preston was appointed by President Millard Fillmore to create a system for surveying land in Oregon Territory. Preston was replaced as Surveyor General in 1853 by Charles Kitchell Gardner. Preston continued his work in canal construction as the Illinois-Michigan canal's superintendent in 1854 and later became the secretary of the Chicago and Alton Railroad. In 1864 Preston became a member of the firm Matteson & Preston in St. Louis before his accidental death in 1865.
