= James Patton Preston =

American politician (1774–1843)

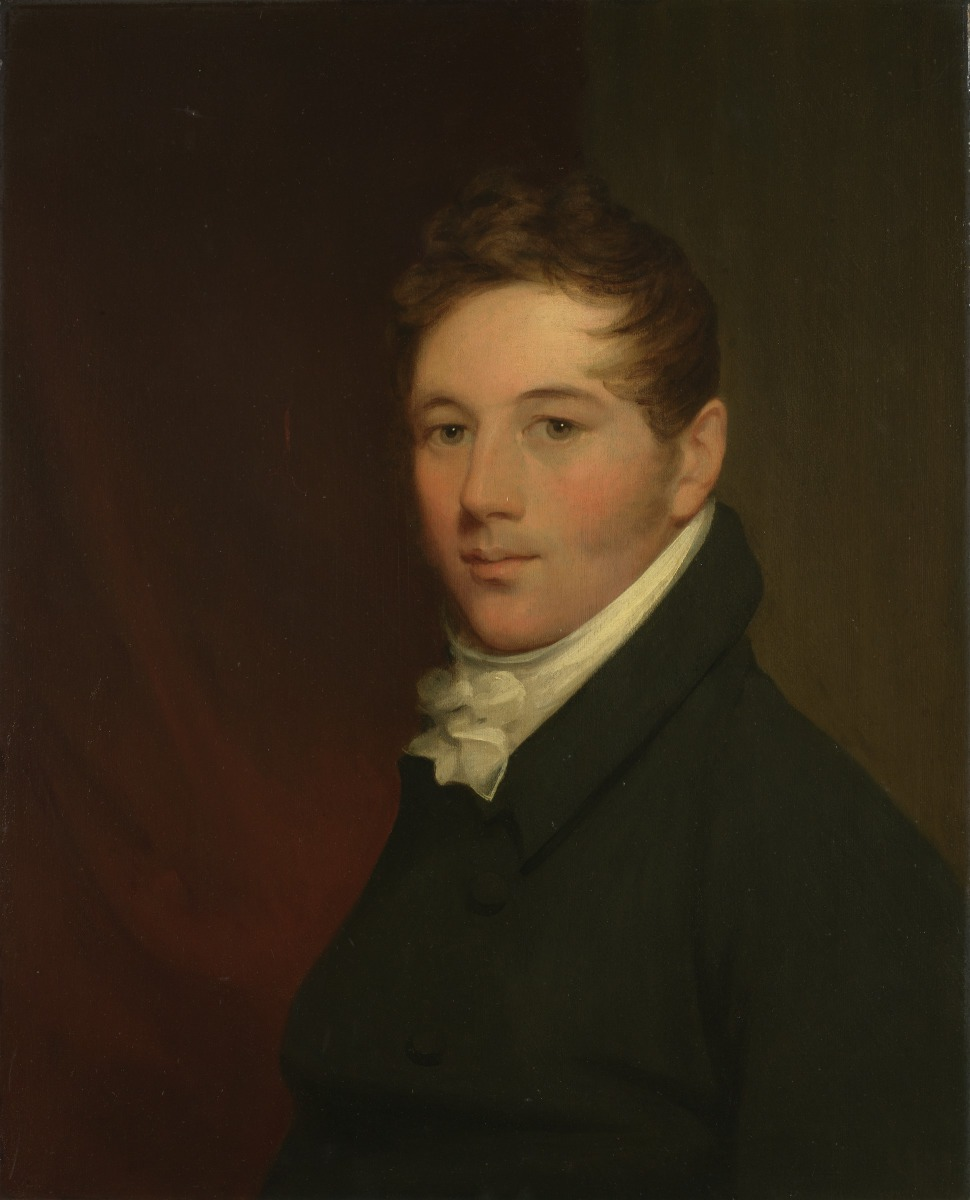
- Portrait by Gilbert Stuart, c. 1803

20th Governor of Virginia
- In office December 1, 1816 – December 1, 1819
- Preceded by: Wilson Cary Nicholas
- Succeeded by: Thomas Mann Randolph, Jr.

Member of the Virginia House of Delegates from Montgomery County
- In office December 3, 1810 – November 30, 1812
- Preceded by: Thomas Goodson
- Succeeded by: Thomas McHenry

Member of the Virginia House of Delegates

Personal details
- Born: June 21, 1774 Smithfield Plantation, Colony of Virginia, British America
- Died: May 4, 1843 (aged 68) Smithfield Plantation, Virginia, U.S.
- Resting place: Smithfield Plantation Cemetery; Blacksburg, Virginia, U.S.
- Party: Democratic-Republican
- Spouse: Ann Barraud Taylor
- Children: 3
- Parent: Colonel William Preston (Father) Susanna Smith (Mother)
- Education: College of William & Mary

James Patton Preston (June 21, 1774 – May 4, 1843) was a U.S. political figure who served as the 20th Governor of Virginia.

== Biography ==
James Patton Preston was born at Smithfield Plantation, in what is now Blacksburg, Virginia. He attended the College of William and Mary from 1790 to 1795 and managed his family's vast estate, which included the land that is now the campus of Virginia Tech and large portions of its college farm. The 7,500-acre (30 km²) tract previously known as Draper's Meadow was granted sometime before 1737 by Governor Robert Dinwiddie to Preston's great uncle and namesake, Colonel James Patton, an Irish sea captain turned land speculator who had died in the Draper's Meadow Massacre. A member of the Democratic-Republican Party, he served for four years the Virginia State Senate, and two years in the Virginia House of Delegates.

Preston joined the United States Army for the War of 1812, serving as lieutenant colonel and second in command of the 12th Infantry Regiment. He was promoted to colonel of the 23rd Infantry Regiment in August 1813 and served until being seriously wounded at the Battle of Crysler's Farm in Ontario.

After the war, Preston returned to the House of Delegates. He served as the 20th Governor of Virginia from 1816 to 1819. His term was marked by the state's payment of more than $1.5 million in debt incurred to cover expenses during the War of 1812 and the establishment of the University of Virginia.

After leaving office, Preston served as Postmaster of Richmond before retiring to his estate.

He died at Smithfield Plantation on May 4, 1843, and is buried in the estate's cemetery.

Preston County, Virginia (now West Virginia) was formed in 1818 and named in his honor. Also named for him is a residence hall at William and Mary.

== Family ==
His father was Colonel William Preston, and his mother was Susanna Smith (1739–1823).

Preston married Ann Taylor (1778–1861), with whom he had three children, William Ballard, Robert Taylor, and James Francis. Their son William Ballard Preston served as a Member of the United States House of Representatives and United States Secretary of the Navy. During the American Civil War, William B. Preston was a Senator in the Congress of the Confederate States.

Sons Robert Taylor Preston and James Francis Preston both served as officers in the Confederate Army during the Civil War.

James Patton Preston was the brother-in-law of John Floyd and the uncle of James McDowell and John Buchanan Floyd.

Political offices
| Preceded by Wilson Cary Nicholas | Governor of Virginia; 1816–1819 | Succeeded by Thomas Mann Randolph, Jr. |
