= Preston Corderman =

United States Army general (1904–1998)

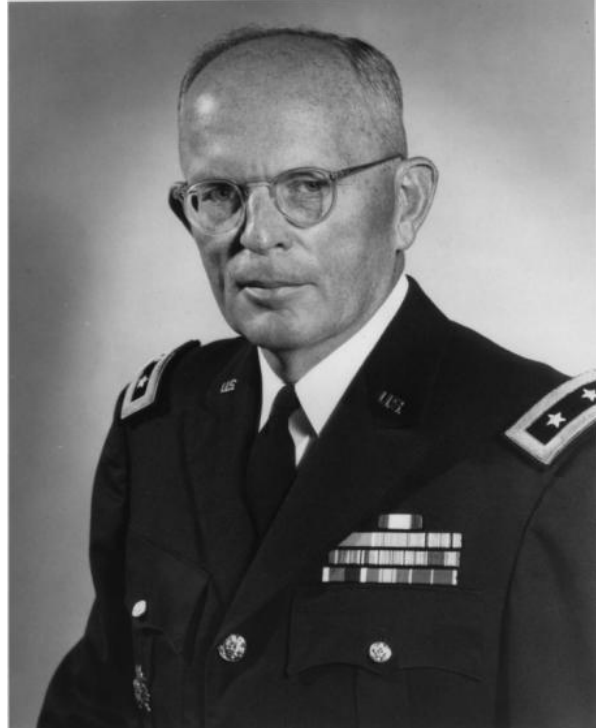
- Born: William Preston Corderman; December 1, 1904; Hagerstown, Maryland, U.S.
- Died: March 4, 1998 (aged 93); Fort Belvoir, Virginia, U.S.
- Education: United States Military Academy (BS); Yale University (MS)
- Spouse: Sarah Virginia Sandt (m. 1929)
- Children: 3
- Military career
- Branch: United States Army (Signal Corps)
- Service years: 1922–1958
- Rank: Major general
- Service number: 016387
- Commands: Fort Monmouth (1957–1958)
- Conflicts: World War II
- Awards: Distinguished Service Medal; Legion of Merit; Order of the British Empire

William Preston Corderman (December 1, 1904 – March 4, 1998) was a United States Army general. He was a signal officer with the United States Army Signal Corps. During World War II, he commanded the U.S. Army Security Agency and supervised the censorship of telephone, post and telegraph. He later served as head of Fort Monmouth from 1957 to 1958. He was a recipient of the Distinguished Service Medal, Legion of Merit and the Order of the British Empire.

== Early life ==
William Preston Corderman was born on December 1, 1904 in Hagerstown, Maryland, to Albert C. Corderman. He entered the United States Military Academy as a cadet in 1922 and graduated in 1926. In 1927, he graduated from Yale University with a Master of Science in communications engineering.

== Career ==
Following graduation from the military academy, Corderman was commissioned as a second lieutenant. After his graduation from Yale, he was stationed at Fort Monmouth and attended Signals Corps School there. He joined with the United States Army Signal Corps and in October 1929, he was stationed at Fort Russell in Wyoming. He was promoted to first lieutenant in October 1932. From June 1932 to March 1936, he served in the War Plans and Training Division of the Office of the Chief Signal Officer. He then served in the Philippines and was promoted to captain in June 1936. In June 1938, he attended the Command and General Staff School at Fort Leavenworth. In 1939, he completed the course and served on the general staff of the United States Department of War.

During World War II, he commanded the U.S. Army Security Agency in Arlington, Virginia. He was acting chief of the Postal and Wire Censor from June 17, 1941, to January 8, 1942. He then served as chief postal censor from January 9, 1942, to January 31, 1943. From the beginning of the war, he initiated and supervised the censorship of telegraph and telephone communications. After declaration of war against Germany and Italy, he supervised the censorship of international mail. Following his appointment as chief, he organized and established censorship liaison with Canada, Cuba, Central and South America. He helped establish postal censorship policy for finance, publications, trade and economic intelligence. He helped plan the establishment of the Censorship Film Board of Review, traveller censorship and the examining of mail of prisoners of war. He helped implement and manage war-time postal censorship. He also served as signal officer of the continental base section of U.S. forces in the European theater. On February 1, 1943, Corderman, then a colonel, became commanding officer of the Arlington Hall Station of the War Department in Arlington.

Corderman was promoted to brigadier general in June 1945. From September 15, 1945, to March 31, 1946, he was Chief of the U.S. Army Security Agency. In 1948, he was assistant director of communications for the Alaskan command and became chief of staff of the command in 1949. Corderman was promoted to the rank of Major General on July 1, 1951. He also served as assistant secretary of the Army and as commander of the Procurement Agency and Signal Supply Agency in Philadelphia. In May 1955, he became the chief signal officer of the Army and was chief of the Engineering and Technical Division (later the Research and Development Division) at Fort Monmouth. On July 1, 1957, he took over as head of Fort Monmouth, succeeding Victor A. Conrad. He retired in August 1958 from his post. In November 1945, he was a recipient of the Distinguished Service Medal. He also received the Legion of Merit and the Order of the British Empire.

While in New Jersey, he established the Brookdale Community College in Lincroft, New Jersey. He served as chairman of the board for eight years starting from its establishment. In 1958, Corderman became an executive with Litton Industries. In the early 1960s, he was vice president of its office in Washington, D.C. In 1964, he became president of the Retired Officers Association.

== Personal life ==
On August 10, 1929, Corderman married Sarah Virginia Sandt, daughter of George M. Sandt, mayor of Red Bank. After their wedding, they moved to Red Bank. They had two sons and one daughter, Douglas G., David M. and Ginger. His son David also served in the Signal Corps. He lived in Washington, D.C., and Little Silver, New Jersey. In 1995, he moved to Fairfax, Virginia.

Corderman died from pneumonia on March 4, 1998, aged 93, at the Fairfax Retirement Community in Fort Belvoir, Virginia.

== Legacy ==
Corderman is a member of the Military Intelligence Hall of Fame.
