= Rob Preston =

American basketball player

Personal information
- Born: December 1, 1982 (age 43) Lynchburg, Ohio
- Listed height: 6 ft 10 in (2.08 m)
- Listed weight: 225 lb (102 kg)

Career information
- High school: Lynchburg-Clay (Lynchburg, Ohio)
- College: Akron (2002–2006)
- NBA draft: 2006: undrafted
- Playing career: 2006–2010
- Position: Power forward / center
- Number: 4

Career history
- 2000–2001: Atomics Brussels
- 2006–2008: Levski Sofia
- 2008–2010: Spartak Pleven
- 2010: Rilski Sportist

Career highlights
- Bulgarian League All-Star Game MVP (2009); 4× Bulgarian League All-Star (2007–2010)

Robert Paul Preston (born December 1, 1982) is an American former professional basketball player.

== College basketball ==
Preston played college basketball at University of Akron. During the 2003–2004 season he averaged 2.0 points and 1.7 rebounds in 8.0 minutes per contest. In 2004-2005 he played 16.5 minutes per game, averaging 4.6 points, 2.8 rebounds and 1.2 assists, shooting .405 from three point territory. In the 2005–2006 campaign, he played 24.5 minutes a game, averaging 8.0 points, 3.9 rebounds, 1.5 assists and 1.2 blocks. He finished his career at Akron playing 108 games, averaging 5.8 points, 1.1 assists, and 3.0 rebounds per game.

== Professional career ==
In August 2006, Preston signed a contract with Bulgarian club BC Levski Sofia. In 2006–2007 he averaged 10.6 points, 6.1 rebounds and 1.1 assists in 27 minutes per game in the Bulgarian first league - Men's A-1.

After two years with BC Levski Sofia he joined Spartak Pleven. In 37 appearances, 36 as a starter he was averaging 13.9 points, 6.5 rebounds and 0.9 assists in 28.8 minutes per game. He shot 60%FG and 39.7% 3PT. He was named All-Star Game MVP.

Preston started the 2009-2010 season with Spartak Pleven, but at mid-season transferred to another Bulgarian club - Rilski Sportist. In 47 games this season, including 33 starts, he averaged 12.1 points, 5.2 rebounds and 1.1 assists. He shot 58% for 2 points and 36% for 3. His best game of the season was in the EUROHOLD Balkan League, against CSA Steaua Turabo in Bucharest, when he scored 33 points, shooting 9/10 for 2 points and 4/8 for three, along with 9 rebounds and 4 assists.

== Personal life ==
Following retirement from professional basketball, Preston joined Total Quality Logistics out of Cincinnati, OH where he has been employed since 2013 as a Logistics Coordinator and Barista.

== Bulgarian League statistics ==
Season	Games	GS	Points	Rebounds	Assists	Blocks	Steals	Turnovers
2006/2007	31	23	10.6	6.1	1.1	0.5	0.6	1.6
2007/2008	42	13	9.9	5.2	1.3	0.5	1.0	0.9
2008/2009	37	36	13.9	6.5	0.9	0.5	0.9	1.4
2009/2010	47	33	12.1	5.2	1.1	0.5	0.8	1.4
Total	157	105	1829	899	178	77	124	207
Average			11.6	5.7	1.1	0.5	0.8	1.3
