= John Preston (music executive) =

British music industry executive (1950–2017)

- Born: John O'Driscoll Preston; 1950; Nottingham, England
- Died: 2017 (aged 66–67)
- Education: Shrewsbury School
- Alma mater: Trinity College, Oxford; University of Liverpool
- Occupation: Music industry executive
- Title: Chairman, BMG
- Term: 1989-98
- Spouse: Roz Preston

John O'Driscoll Preston (1950–2017) was a British music industry executive.

== Early life ==
John O'Driscoll Preston was born in Nottingham, the son of Major Ian Preston, a Royal Artillery officer who later worked for an Edinburgh brewery, and an actress mother who insisted on using her unusual middle name, Michael Preston (née Cochrane). He was educated at Shrewsbury School followed by Trinity College, Oxford, where he studied history, and University of Liverpool, where he earned a degree in Latin American history in 1972.

== Career ==
Preston started his career with Bruce's Record Shops in Scotland, then joined EMI in 1977.

In 1984, he was managing director of Polydor Records UK. Preston was the managing director of RCA Records UK from 1985 to 1989, and chairman of BMG from 1989 to 1998.

Preston chaired the UK Labour Party's Rock the Vote campaign for Tony Blair.

Preston worked with musicians including Annie Lennox and Dave Stewart, M People and Take That. Music industry people he gave early career opportunities to include Simon Cowell, Hugh Goldsmith, David Joseph, Jeremy Marsh and Korda Marshall, and he was the first chairman of a record company to promote two women to the level of label managing director, Lisa Anderson at RCA, and Diana Graham at Arista.

== Personal life ==
Preston was married to Roz.
