= Robert Preston (American politician) =

American politician (1929–2021)

Robert F. Preston (May 11, 1929 – December 27, 2021) was an American businessman and politician.

Preston was born in Lowell, Massachusetts on May 11, 1929. He graduated from Keith Academy (now Lowell Catholic High School) and served in the United States Army during World War II and the Korean War. Preston went to Saint Anselm College (Goffstown, New Hampshire), and graduated from Salem State University (Salem, Massachusetts).

He was involved in the restaurant and real estate businesses in Hampton, New Hampshire. Preston served for 11 hours in the New Hampshire Senate in 1964 until his residency requirement was challenged. Preston then was elected to the New Hampshire Senate in 1972 and served until 1990. He was a Democrat. He died in Hampton, New Hampshire, on December 27, 2021, aged 92.
