= Byron W. Preston =

American judge (1858–1939)

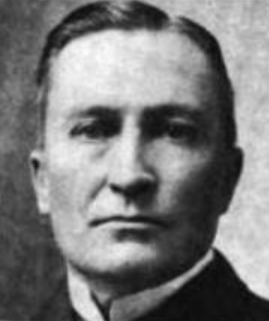

Justice of the Iowa Supreme Court
- In office 1913 – December 31, 1924

Personal details
- Born: February 13, 1858; Newton, Iowa
- Died: January 18, 1939 (aged 80); Oskaloosa, Iowa
- Political party: Republican
- Spouse: Neillie Blanchard (m. 1880)
- Children: 2
- Education: Iowa College
- Occupation: Jurist

Byron W. Preston (February 13, 1858 – January 18, 1939) was a justice of the Iowa Supreme Court from 1913 to December 31, 1924, appointed from Mahaska County, Iowa.

== Biography ==
Byron W. Preston was born in Newton, Iowa on February 13, 1858. He attended Iowa College, worked in the mercantile business, read law, and was admitted to the bar in 1884.

He married Nellie Blanchard in 1880, and they had a son and a daughter.

He worked as a county attorney, city attorney, and district court judge before being elected to the Iowa Supreme Court. He remained on the bench from 1913 to 1924.

He died at his home in Oskaloosa, Iowa on January 18, 1939.

Political offices
Preceded by	Justice of the Iowa Supreme Court; 1913–1924	Succeeded by
