= Platt A. Preston =

American politician

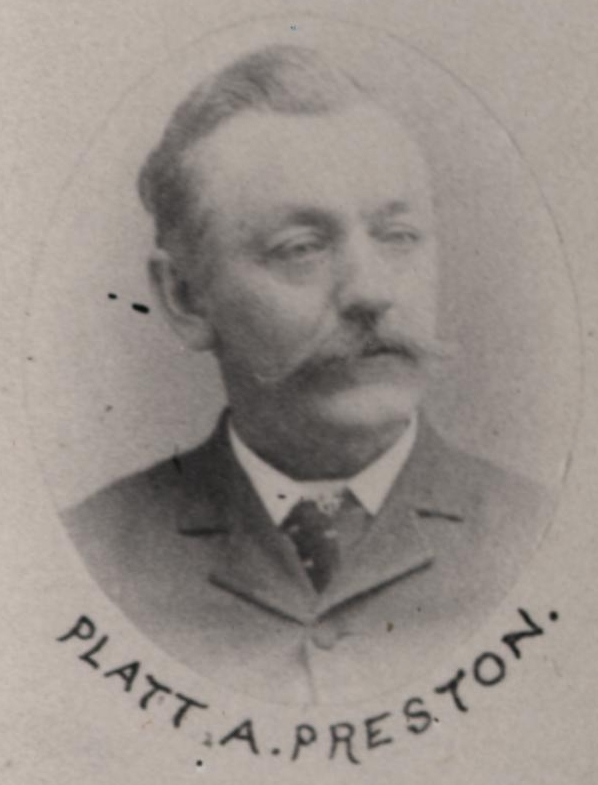
- Preston in 1891

Member of the Washington State Senate
- In office January 7, 1891 – January 9, 1893
- Preceded by: Eugene T. Wilson
- Succeeded by: David Miller
- Constituency: 10th
- In office November 6, 1889 – January 7, 1891
- Preceded by: Constituency established
- Succeeded by: C. G. Austin
- Constituency: 8th

Personal details
- Born: Platt Adams Preston; November 1, 1837 Saratoga, New York, U.S.
- Died: March 12, 1900 (aged 62) Galveston, Texas, U.S.
- Party: Republican

Platt Adams Preston (November 1, 1837 – March 12, 1900) was an American politician in the state of Washington. He served in the Washington State Senate from 1889 to 1893 (1889–91 for district 8, 1891–93 for district 10).
