= James Preston (cricketer) =

English cricketer (1792–1842)

Personal information
- Full name: James Preston
- Born: 1792; England
- Died: 9 April 1842 (aged 49–50); Kingston, Surrey County, Jamaica
- Batting: Unknown

Domestic team information
- Years: Team
- 1828: Sussex

Career statistics
Competition	First-class
Matches	1
Runs scored	46
Batting average	46.00
100s/50s	–/–
Top score	29*
Balls bowled	–
Wickets	–
Bowling average	–
5 wickets in innings	–
10 wickets in match	–
Best bowling	–
Catches/stumpings	–/–
- Source: Cricinfo, 7 January 2012

James Preston (1792 – 9 April 1842) was an English cricketer. Preston's batting style is unknown.

Preston made a single first-class appearance for Sussex against Kent at the Royal New Ground, Brighton, in 1828. He ended Sussex's first-innings of 118 all out unbeaten on 29, while in response to that total Kent were dismissed for just 23. In Sussex's second-innings of 102 all out, Preston scored 17 runs before being dismissed by William Ashby. Kent made 96/8 in their chase, with the match ending in a draw.

He died at Kingston in the British Colony of Jamaica on 19 April 1842.
