= George Henry Preston =

British gardener (1911–2003)

George Henry Preston (1911-2003) was a gardener who was curator in the Alpine and Herbaceous Department at Kew Gardens.

== Career ==
George Preston was born in Cambridge, 11 September 1911; his father was Frederick George Preston, who was Foreman and later Superintendent at Cambridge University Botanic Garden. After working in the Cambridge Botanic Garden he entered the Royal Horticultural Society garden at Wisley, where he obtained an RHS Diploma in Horticulture.

In 1935 he moved to the Royal Botanic Gardens, Kew where obtained his Kew Certificate; he spent the remainder of his career at Kew. He was appointed Foreman and then Assistant Curator of the Alpine and Herbaceous Department in 1938. From the 1950s his duties included the Chelsea Flower Show.

He was elected a Fellow of the Linnean Society of London in 1953. The British Iris Society awarded him the Foster Memorial Plaque in 1966 for his work on Irises. In 1971 was awarded the RHS Associate Medal of Honour. He was awarded the Lyttel Lily Cup in 1966 for his work on Lilium. He was on various horticultural committees and a regular judge for the Alpine Garden Society.

== Personal life ==
In 1960 he married Joan Turner in Cambridge. In 1972 he retired to Hinton Way, Great Shelford, and died 1 December 2003 in Cambridge.

== Publications ==
- Everyday Gardening (1955) edited by G H Preston, Ward Lock
- All About Gardening (1963) J Coutts, Edited by G H Preston, Ward, Lock & Co, ISBN 978-0706315059
- Climbing and wall plants (1992) London:Cassell, ISBN 0304320323, 3rd edition
- The Courtyard and Terrace Gardens (1993) George Preston, George Elliot, Ray Waite, Robert Pearson
