= Effa E. Preston =

American educator (1884–1975)

- Born: March 13, 1884; Yonkers, New York, U.S.
- Died: May 3, 1975 (aged 91); Atlantic Highlands, New Jersey, U.S.
- Other name: E. E. Preston
- Occupations: Educator; writer; speaker

Effa Estelle Preston (March 13, 1884 – May 2, 1975) was an American teacher and writer, based in New Jersey. She was a prolific author of school plays and pageants, and of comic verse about teachers' lives.

== Early life and education ==
Preston was born in Yonkers, New York, the daughter of Garrett Preston and Anna E. Preston. She graduated from Trenton Normal School in 1908, and from New York University.

== Career ==
Preston taught school in New Brunswick, New Jersey, for 38 years, from 1915 until her retirement in 1953. She wrote many plays, musicals, and songs for school use, and contributed poems to a humor column in an educational journal. She spoke to professional groups. She served on the editorial board of the New Jersey Education Review. Her plays and operettas were performed in schools across the United States. She helped her students raise funds for an animal shelter each year.

== Personal life ==
A long-time resident of New Brunswick, Preston died on May 2, 1975, at the age of 91, at a nursing home in Atlantic Highlands, New Jersey.

== Publications ==
=== Books ===
- The Popular Commencement Book (1931)
- Modern Pantomime Entertainments (1938)
- Modern Entertainments for Churches (1939, with Maud C. Jackson)
- The Modern Stunt Book (1945, with Beatrice Plumb and Harry W. Githens)
- The Closing Day Program Book, for eighth grade and junior high school (1953, with Beatrice Marie Casey)
- Good things for closing day, for the upper and lower intermediate grades (1953, with Beatrice Marie Casey)
- Fun with Stunts (1956)
- The Master Puppet Book (1965, with Leroy Stahl)

In a toy shop (IA intoyshop00pres)

=== Plays, programs, and pageants ===
- "One Christmas Eve" (1913)
- "Cinderella" (1914)
- "Flag Day Exercise" (1915)
- Uncle Sam's Right Arm: A Patriotic Exercise (1918)
- The Dolls on Dress Parade (1922)
- In a Toy Shop: A Christmas Play for Small Children (1922)
- A Party in Mother Goose Land (1922, one-act play)
- A Strike in Santa Land (1922, one-act play)
- A Thanksgiving Dream (1922, one-act play)
- The Children's Book of Christmas Recitations, Songs, Exercises, Plays, and Stories (1926)
- Mother Goose Celebrates: A Pageant for Primary Schools (1926)
- Our United States: A Patriotic Pageant (1926)
- Santa's Air Line: A Christmas Operetta (1926, with George W. Wilmot)
- The Thief of Time (1933, play)
- The Gypsy Troubadour (1934, operetta, with Don Wilson)
- The Cobbler of Fairyland (1937, operetta, with Carol Winston)
- The Bamboo Princess (1937, operetta, with Henry S. Sawyer)
- Peace Rules the Day (1939, play)
- Getting Gracie Graduated (1947, one-act play)
- First Floor Front (three-act play)
- Danger at the Crossroads (two-act play)
- The Pastry Chef and the Pirate (1968, with Harry L. Alford)

=== Poetry, songs, and humor ===
- "Archery Drill" and "Indian Drill" (1928, songs, with George W. Wilmot)
- "Revolt of a Filler-Outer" (1937, poem)
- "Salvation" (1938, poem)
- "Epitaphs No. 1", "Epitaphs No. 2", and "Epitaphs No. 3" (1939, poems)
- "L'Envoi (With No Apologies to Kipling or Anyone Else)" "The Old Teachers" How to Inherit the Earth" "If the Albatross Fits, Wear It", and "Mother Goose School Law"(1940, poems)
- "Teacher's Mother Goose: The Cupboard of Hubbard Was Bare" and "To Have and Have Not"(1941, poems)
- "Our Miss Green" and "Poor Miss Beck" (1942, poems)
- "Pupil-to-Teacher Valentine" (1943, poem)
- "Teacher--to any School Board" (1945, poem)
- "What Price Parents?" and "The Little Moron" (1946, poems)
- "A Kitten's Salary" (1947, humor)
- "A Bonus--Perhaps!" (1947, poem)
- "We're Fashionable, Anyway" (1948, poem)
- "Too Bad!" and "The Little Teacher" (1949, poems)
