= William Edward Hayter Preston =

British author and literary editor (1891–1964)

William Edward Hayter Preston (1891–1964) was a British literary editor, journalist, poet and author of several books.

W. E. Hayter Preston was from adolescence interested in freethought, socialism and the occult. In 1906 he became a friend of Victor Benjamin Neuburg, who introduced him to Aleister Crowley. In 1912 Preston joined Crowley's group Mysteria Mystica Maxima but left the group in 1914 following an argument with Crowley. Starting in 1925, Preston wrote a column for The Sunday Referee under the pseudonym "Vanoc II" — the columnist "Vanoc I" was Arnold White (who died in February 1925). Preston became the literary editor for The Sunday Referee. In April 1940 he was one of the founders of the Surrealist Group in London.

== Books ==
- The house of vanities. 1922.
- Childhood days. 1922.
- Windmills. 1923. (with illustrations by Frank Brangwyn; 12 editions from 1923 to 1975)
- with Henry Savage: The eagle: the story of the film. 1926; an adaptation of the 1925 silent film The Eagle.
- with Henry Savage: The sea beast: the novel of the film. 1926; an adaptation of the 1926 silent film The Sea Beast.
- with Henry Savage: Faust. Readers Library Publishing Company. 1927; an adaptation of the film plot of the 1926 silent film Faust to the form of a novel.
- They shoot to kill (Secrets of the G-Men). Queensway. 1938; 255 pages
