= Preston =

Preston or Prestons may refer to:

== People and fictional characters ==
- Preston (given name), a list of people and fictional characters
- Preston (surname), a list of people and fictional characters
- Preston (singer), British singer Samuel Preston (born 1982)

== Places ==
=== Australia ===
- Prestons, New South Wales
- Preston, Queensland, Toowoomba and Lockyer Valley regions
- Preston, Queensland (Whitsunday Region)
- Preston, Tasmania
- Preston, Victoria
  - City of Preston (Victoria)
  - Electoral district of Preston

=== Canada ===
- Preston, Nova Scotia
  - Preston (electoral district)
- Preston, Ontario
- Preston Street (Ottawa)

=== England ===
- Preston, Lancashire, city in Lancashire
  - City of Preston, Lancashire, a borough and non-metropolitan district
  - County Borough of Preston, a local government district containing the settlement from 1835 to 1974
  - Preston (constituency)
  - The PR postcode area, also known as the Preston postcode area
  - Preston Urban Area, the conurbation with Preston at its core
- Preston, Devon (in Paignton)
- Preston, Teignbridge, in Kingsteignton parish, Devon
- Preston, Dorset
- Preston, East Riding of Yorkshire, near Kingston upon Hull
- Preston, Brighton, East Sussex, a suburb
- Preston, Cotswold, Gloucestershire, a village
- Preston, Forest of Dean, Gloucestershire, a village
- Preston, Hertfordshire
- City of Preston, Lancashire
- Preston, London, near Wembley
  - Preston (ward)
- Preston, Northumberland, the location of Preston Tower
- Preston, Rutland
- Preston, Shropshire, in Upton Magna parish
- Preston, Somerset, in Stogumber parish
- Preston, Tyne and Wear
- Preston, Aldbourne and Ramsbury, Wiltshire
- Preston, Lyneham, Wiltshire
- Preston Bagot, Warwickshire
- Preston Bissett, Buckinghamshire
- Preston Brook, Cheshire
- Preston Candover, Hampshire
- Preston Capes, Northamptonshire
- Preston Crowmarsh, Oxfordshire
- Preston Deanery, Northamptonshire
- Preston Gubbals, Shropshire
- Preston-le-Skerne, County Durham
- Preston-next-Faversham, Kent
- Preston-next-Wingham, Dover, Kent; better known as Preston
- Preston on Stour, Warwickshire
- Preston-on-Tees, Stockton-on-Tees, County Durham
- Preston on the Hill, Cheshire
- Preston on Wye, Herefordshire
- Preston Plucknett, Somerset
- Preston St Mary, Suffolk
- Preston-under-Scar, North Yorkshire
- Preston upon the Weald Moors, Shropshire

=== Scotland ===
- Preston, East Linton, East Lothian
- Preston, Prestonpans, East Lothian
- Preston, Scottish Borders, near Duns
- Preston Island, reclaimed land in the Firth of Forth
- Prestonkirk or Preston, near East Linton, East Lothian
- Preston Mill, a watermill near East Linton, East Lothian

=== United States ===
- Preston, Alabama; see List of places in Alabama: N–R#P
- Preston, Arkansas; see List of places in Arkansas: P
- Preston, California
- Preston, Colorado
- Preston, Connecticut
- Preston, Georgia
- Preston, Idaho
- Preston, Illinois
- Preston, Indiana
- Preston, Iowa
- Preston, Kansas
- Preston, Kentucky
- Preston, Maryland
- Preston, Michigan
- Preston, Minnesota
- Preston, Mississippi
- Preston, Missouri (in Hickory County)
- Preston, Jasper County, Missouri
- Preston, Nebraska
- Preston, Nevada
- Preston, New York
- Preston, North Carolina
- Preston, Oklahoma
- Preston, Luzerne County, Pennsylvania; see List of places in Pennsylvania: Pl–Q
- Preston, McKean County, Pennsylvania; see List of places in Pennsylvania: Pl–Q
- Preston, South Dakota, a ghost town
- Preston, Texas, Grayson County
- Preston, Wharton County, Texas
- Preston, Virginia
- Preston, Washington
- Preston, West Virginia
- Preston County, West Virginia
- Preston, Adams County, Wisconsin, a town
- Preston, Grant County, Wisconsin, an unincorporated community
- Preston, Trempealeau County, Wisconsin, a town
- Preston Township (disambiguation)

=== Elsewhere ===
- Guatemala, Cuba, also known as Preston, in Holguín Province
- Prestons, New Zealand
- 3792 Preston, an asteroid

== Schools ==
- Preston University (United States), a controversial unaccredited institution
- Preston University (Pakistan), a private university
- Preston College, a further education college in Preston, Lancashire, England
- Preston High School (disambiguation)

== Ships ==
- HMS Preston, multiple ships
- USS Preston, multiple ships
- Preston (ship), multiple ships

== Sports ==
- Preston (speedway), a British speedway team
- Preston North End F.C., an English football club
- Preston Grasshoppers R.F.C., an English rugby football club

== Transportation ==
- Preston railway station, Melbourne, Australia
- Preston railway station, Preston, Lancashire, England
- Preston Road tube station, a London Underground station
- Preston station (Houston), Texas, US
- Preston Road, Dallas, Texas
- Preston Street (disambiguation)

== Other uses ==
- HM Prison Preston, a prison in England
- Preston baronets, baronetcies created for persons with the surname Preston
- Preston Car Company, a Canadian railway equipment builder
- 3792 Preston, an asteroid

== See also ==
- South Preston, Tasmania, Australia
- East Preston, Nova Scotia, Canada
- North Preston, Nova Scotia
- Great Preston, West Yorkshire, England
- Long Preston, North Yorkshire
