= USS Racine (LST-1191) =

Newport-class tank landing ship

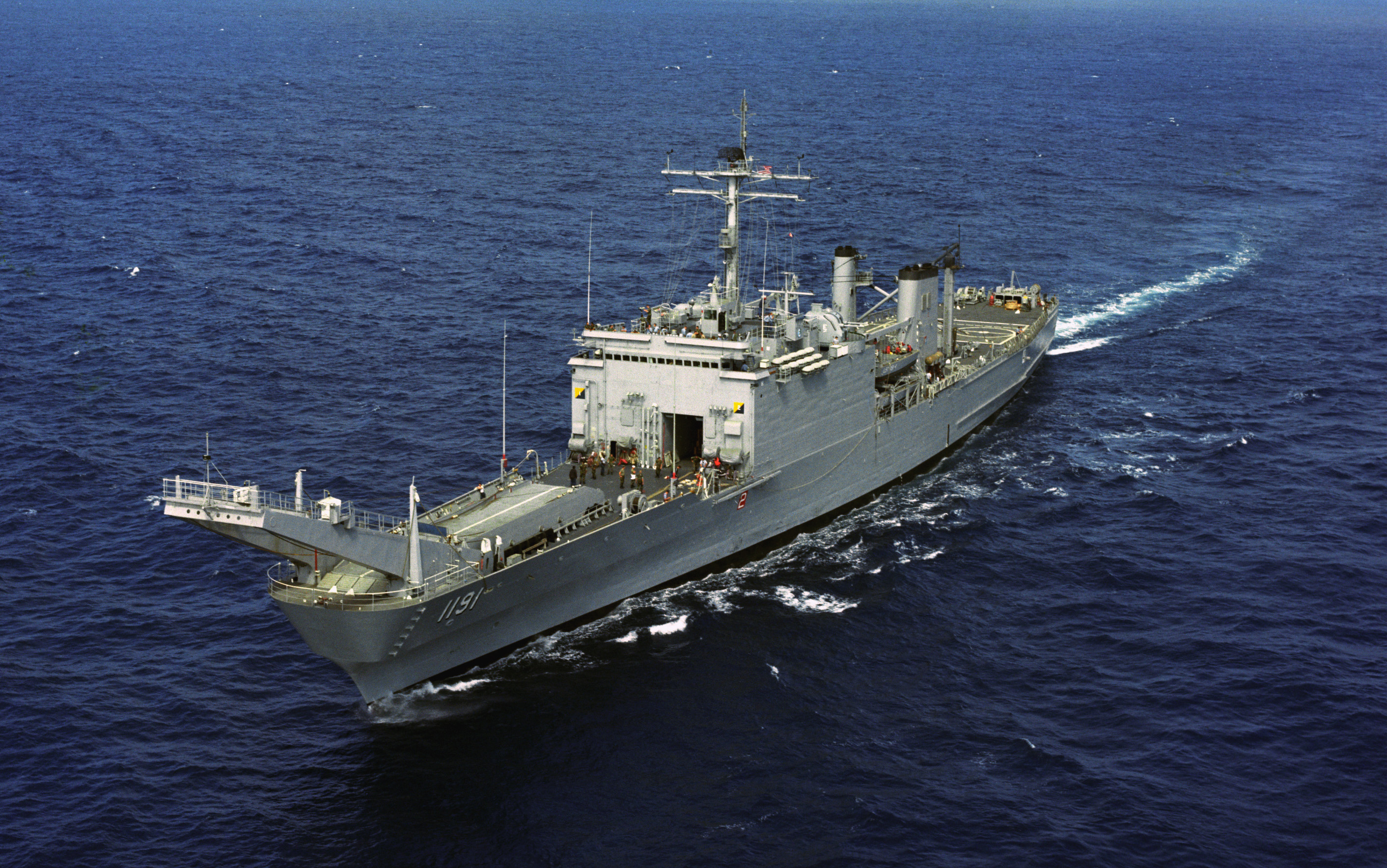
- USS Racine underway

History

United States
- Name: USS Racine
- Namesake: Racine, Wisconsin
- Ordered: 15 July 1966
- Builder: National Steel and Shipbuilding Company, San Diego, California
- Laid down: 13 December 1969
- Launched: 15 August 1970
- Commissioned: 9 July 1971
- Decommissioned: 2 October 1993
- Stricken: 1 December 2008
- Identification: LST-1191
- Motto: Honor, Vigilance, Valor
- Fate: Sunk as a target during RIMPAC 2018 on 12 July 2018
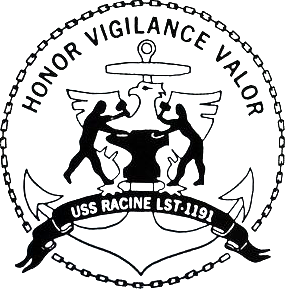
- Badge

General characteristics as built
- Class & type: Newport-class tank landing ship
- Displacement: 4,793 long tons (4,870 t) light; 8,342 long tons (8,476 t) full load
- Length: 522 ft 4 in (159.2 m) oa; 562 ft (171.3 m) over derrick arms
- Beam: 69 ft 6 in (21.2 m)
- Draft: 17 ft 6 in (5.3 m) max
- Propulsion: 2 shafts; 6 Alco diesel engines (3 per shaft); 16,500 shp (12,300 kW); Bow thruster
- Speed: 22 knots (41 km/h; 25 mph) max
- Range: 2,500 nmi (4,600 km; 2,900 mi) at 14 knots (26 km/h; 16 mph)
- Troops: 431 max
- Complement: 213
- Sensors & processing systems: 2 × Mk 63 GCFS; SPS-10 radar
- Armament: 2 × twin 3"/50 caliber guns
- Aviation facilities: Helicopter deck

USS Racine (LST-1191) was the thirteenth of twenty Newport-class tank landing ships of the United States Navy (USN) which replaced the traditional bow door-design tank landing ships (LSTs). The second ship named after the city in Wisconsin, the ship was constructed by National Steel and Shipbuilding Company of San Diego, California. The LST was launched in 1970 and was commissioned in 1971. Racine was assigned to the United States west coast and deployed to the western Pacific Ocean during the Vietnam War. The ship was transferred to the Naval Reserve Force in 1981. The LST was decommissioned in 1993 and placed in reserve. Racine was struck from the Naval Vessel Register in 2008 and after an attempted sale to Peru failed, was discarded as a target ship during a sinking exercise in July 2018.

== Design and description ==
Racine was a Newport-class tank landing ship which were designed to meet the goal put forward by the United States amphibious forces to have a tank landing ship (LST) capable of over 20 knots (37 km/h; 23 mph). However, the traditional bow door form for LSTs would not be capable. Therefore, the designers of the Newport class came up with a design of a traditional ship hull with a 112-foot (34 m) aluminum ramp slung over the bow supported by two derrick arms. The 34-long-ton (35 t) ramp was capable of sustaining loads up to 75 long tons (76 t). This made the Newport class the first to depart from the standard LST design that had been developed in early World War II.

The LST had a displacement of 4,793 long tons (4,870 t) when light and 8,342 long tons (8,476 t) at full load. Racine was 522 feet 4 inches (159.2 m) long overall and 562 ft (171.3 m) over the derrick arms which protruded past the bow. The vessel had a beam of 69 ft 6 in (21.2 m), a draft forward of 11 ft 5 in (3.5 m) and 17 ft 5 in (5.3 m) at the stern at full load.

Racine was fitted with six ALCO diesel engines turning two shafts, three to each shaft. The system was rated at 16,500 brake horsepower (12,300 kW) and gave the ship a maximum speed of 22 knots (41 km/h; 25 mph) for short periods and could only sustain 20 knots (37 km/h; 23 mph) for an extended length of time. The LST carried 1,750 long tons (1,780 t) of diesel fuel for a range of 2,500 nautical miles (4,600 km; 2,900 mi) at the cruising speed of 14 knots (26 km/h; 16 mph). The ship was also equipped with a bow thruster to allow for better maneuvering near causeways and to hold position while offshore during the unloading of amphibious vehicles.

The Newport class were larger and faster than previous LSTs and were able to transport tanks, heavy vehicles and engineer groups and supplies that were too large for helicopters or smaller landing craft to carry. The LSTs have a ramp forward of the superstructure that connects the lower tank deck with the main deck and a passage large enough to allow access to the parking area amidships. The vessels are also equipped with a stern gate to allow the unloading of amphibious vehicles directly into the water or to unload onto a utility landing craft (LCU) or pier. At either end of the tank deck there is a 30 ft (9.1 m) turntable that permits vehicles to turn around without having to reverse. The Newport class has the capacity for 500 long tons (510 t) of vehicles, 19,000 ft^{2} (1,800 m^{2}) of cargo area and could carry up to 431 troops. The vessels also have davits for four vehicle and personnel landing craft (LCVPs) and could carry four pontoon causeway sections along the sides of the hull.

Racine was initially armed with four Mark 33 3-inch (76 mm)/50 caliber guns in two twin turrets. The vessel was equipped with two Mk 63 gun control fire systems (GCFS) for the 3-inch guns, but these were removed in 1977–1978. The ship also had SPS-10 surface search radar. Atop the stern gate, the vessels mounted a helicopter deck. They had a maximum complement of 213 including 11 officers.

== Construction and career ==
The LST was ordered as the fourth hull of the third group in Fiscal Year 1967 and a contract was awarded on 15 July 1966. The ship was laid down by the National Steel & Shipbuilding Company, at their yard in San Diego, California on 13 December 1969. Named for the city in Wisconsin, Racine was launched on 15 August 1970, sponsored by the wife of Vice Admiral Edwin B. Hooper. Racine was placed in commission on 9 July 1971.

Racine entered service on the west coast of the United States and spent time performing routine tasks along the coast and participating in naval exercises. Beginning in June 1972, the ship was sent on a training cruise to South America before returning to the US in July. On 13 September 1972, the LST was deployed to the western Pacific, transporting troops and supplies between the various US bases there and Vietnam. Racine returned to San Diego on 17 May 1973. The LST returned to the western Pacific in 1974, 1976–1977, 1978–1979 and 1980. For service during the Vietnam War, Racine earned one battle star. On 6 November 1979, Racine collided with Li Tung Sol, a small fishing vessel. No injuries were reported. On 15 January 1981, the LST was transferred to the Naval Reserve Force.

Racine was decommissioned on 2 October 1993 was placed in inactive reserve at Pearl Harbor, Hawaii. The ship was struck from the Naval Vessel Register on 1 December 2008. In 2009, there was discussion of a possible sale of ex-Fresno and ex-Racine to Peru. This plan did not materialize and ex-Fresno was sunk as a target in 2014. Ex-Racine was listed as "disposal by experimental use" by Naval Sea Systems Command (NAVSEA) in September 2016.

On 12 July 2018, ex-Racine was struck by live fire as part of a sinking exercise (SINKEX) involving units from Australia, Japan, and the United States. The ship was sunk by a Harpoon missile fired from a Royal Australian Air Force Boeing P-8A Poseidon and a Mark 48 torpedo from the United States Navy Los Angeles-class submarine USS Olympia. The torpedo hit the LST amidships, breaking the vessel's keel and sinking it in waters 15,000 feet (4,600 m) deep, 55 nmi (102 km; 63 mi) north of Kauaʻi, Hawaii.
