= TCG İçel =

TCG İçel is the name of the following ships of the Turkish Navy:

- TCG İçel (D 344), ex-USS Preston (DD-795), a Fletcher-class destroyer acquired in 1969, scrapped in 1981
- TCG İçel (F 518), an Istanbul-class frigate launched in 2025

== See also ==
- İçel
