= Peston =

Peston may refer to:

- Maurice Peston, Baron Peston of Mile End (1931–2016), British economist
- Robert Peston (born 1960), British journalist
- Peston on Sunday, politics programme on ITV presented by Robert Peston
- Peston (TV programme), successor show to Peston on Sunday

== See also ==
- Preston (disambiguation)
- Pesto
