= Preston (ship) =

Several ships have been named Preston:

- Preston was launched at Liverpool in 1769 under another name. As Tom she made one voyage in 1779 as a slave ship in the triangular trade in enslaved people. She became Preston in 1780, and then under the command of Captain William Brighouse she made five voyages as a slave ship. In 1789 Preston became Apollo.
- Preston (1798 EIC ship) was an East Indiaman. She made six voyages for the British East India Company (EIC) between 1805 and 1819. In 1810 and 1811 she participated as a transport in two British military campaigns. She was sold for breaking up in 1812 but instead became a transport and a West Indiaman. She disappeared after a gale in August 1815.
- Preston (1809 ship) was a Dano-Norwegian vessel that the British captured c.1809. As a British merchantman she initially traded with the Iberian peninsula. An American vessel captured and released her in 1812 and she foundered later that year.
- W. T. Preston was a sternwheeler that operated from 1929 to 1981 as a snagboat on rivers in Puget Sound.

== See also ==
- HMS Preston – any one of three vessels of the British Royal Navy
- USS Preston – any one of six vessels of the United States Navy
