= City of Preston =

City of Preston may refer to:

- City of Preston, Lancashire, a non-metropolitan district with official city status in Lancashire, England
  - Preston, Lancashire, an urban settlement within the district
- City of Preston (Victoria), a former local government area in Victoria, Australia
- Preston City, Connecticut, a village in Connecticut, United States

== See also ==
- Preston (disambiguation)
