= USS Preston (DD-327) =

Clemson-class destroyer

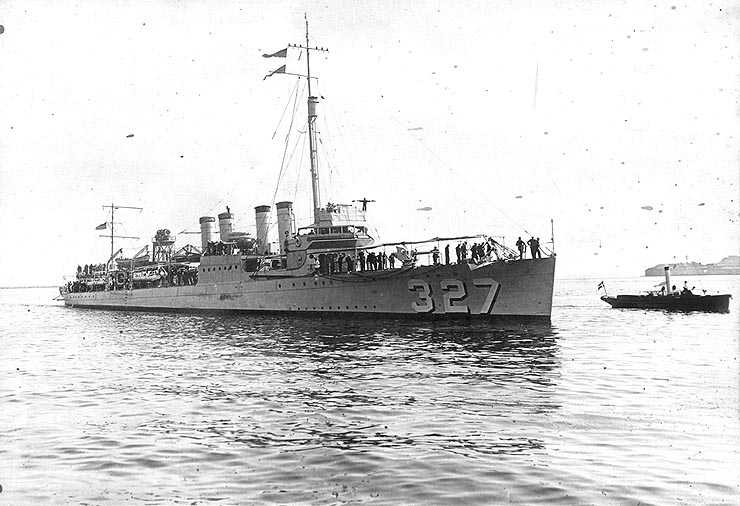
- USS Preston

History

United States
- Namesake: Samuel W. Preston
- Builder: Bethlehem Shipbuilding Corporation, Union Iron Works, San Francisco
- Laid down: 19 July 1919
- Launched: 7 August 1920
- Commissioned: 13 April 1921
- Decommissioned: 1 May 1930
- Stricken: 6 November 1931
- Fate: Sold for scrap, 23 August 1932

General characteristics
- Class & type: Clemson-class destroyer
- Displacement: 1,290 long tons (1,311 t) (standard); 1,389 long tons (1,411 t) (deep load)
- Length: 314 ft 4 in (95.8 m)
- Beam: 30 ft 11 in (9.42 m)
- Draught: 10 ft 3 in (3.1 m)
- Installed power: 27,000 shp (20,000 kW); 4 water-tube boilers
- Propulsion: 2 shafts, 2 steam turbines
- Speed: 35 knots (65 km/h; 40 mph) (design)
- Range: 2,500 nautical miles (4,600 km; 2,900 mi) at 20 knots (37 km/h; 23 mph) (design)
- Complement: 6 officers, 108 enlisted men
- Armament: 4 × single 4-inch (102 mm) guns; 2 × single 1-pounder AA guns or; 2 × single 3-inch (76 mm) guns; 4 × triple 21 inch (533 mm) torpedo tubes; 2 × depth charge rails

USS Preston (DD-327) was a Clemson-class destroyer built for the United States Navy during World War I.

== Description ==
The Clemson class was a repeat of the preceding Wickes class although more fuel capacity was added. The ships displaced 1,290 long tons (1,311 t) at standard load and 1,389 long tons (1,411 t) at deep load. They had an overall length of 314 feet 4 inches (95.8 m), a beam of 30 feet 11 inches (9.4 m) and a draught of 10 feet 3 inches (3.1 m). They had a crew of 6 officers and 108 enlisted men.

Performance differed radically between the ships of the class, often due to poor workmanship. The Clemson class was powered by two steam turbines, each driving one propeller shaft, using steam provided by four water-tube boilers. The turbines were designed to produce a total of 27,000 shaft horsepower (20,000 kW) intended to reach a speed of 35 knots (65 km/h; 40 mph). The ships carried a maximum of 371 long tons (377 t) of fuel oil which was intended gave them a range of 2,500 nautical miles (4,600 km; 2,900 mi) at 20 knots (37 km/h; 23 mph).

The ships were armed with four 4-inch (102 mm) guns in single mounts and were fitted with two 1-pounder guns for anti-aircraft defense. In many ships a shortage of 1-pounders caused them to be replaced by 3-inch (76 mm) guns. Their primary weapon, though, was their torpedo battery of a dozen 21 inch (533 mm) torpedo tubes in four triple mounts. They also carried a pair of depth charge rails. A "Y-gun" depth charge thrower was added to many ships.

== Construction and career ==
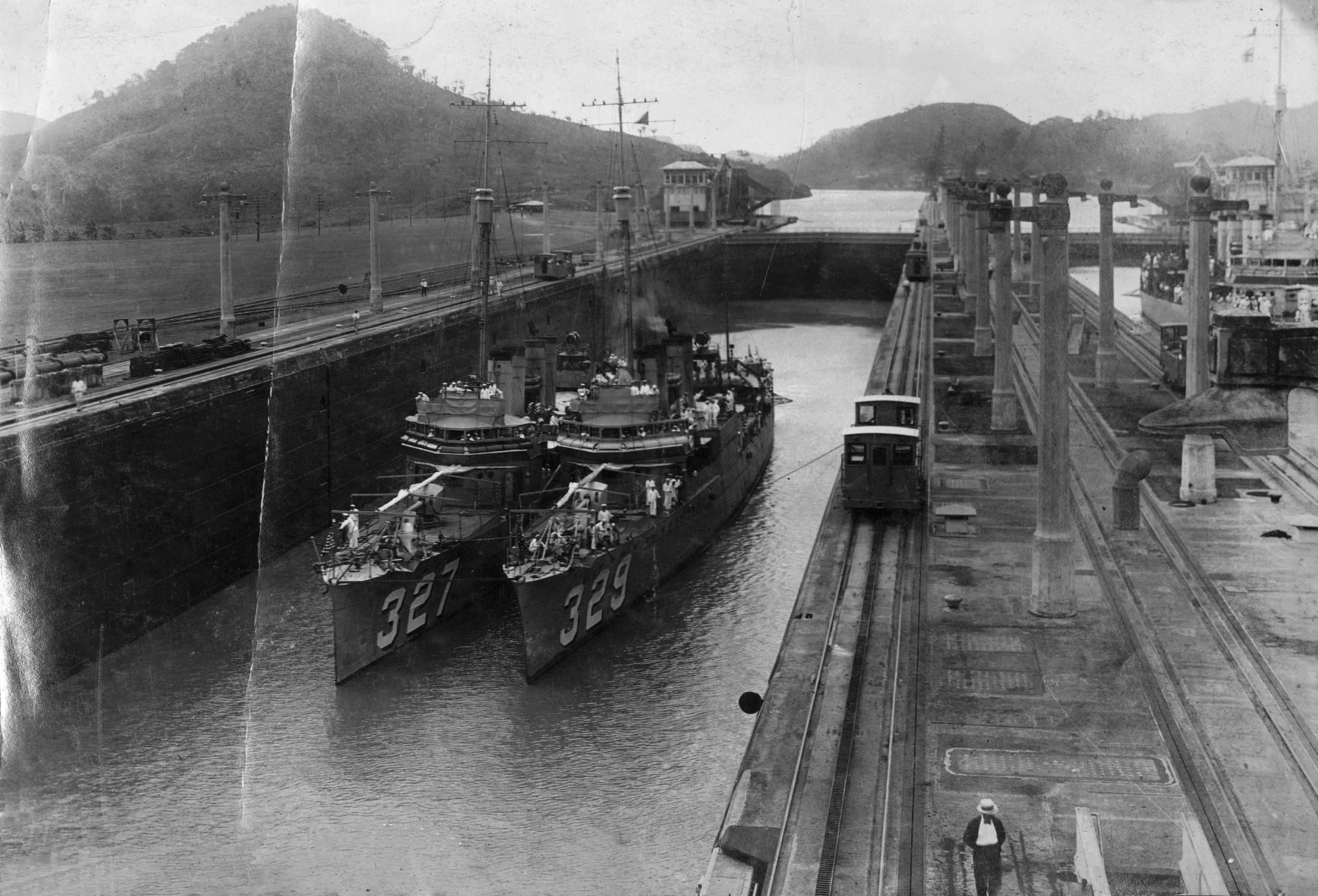
Preston and Bruce in the Pedro Miguel Locks, ca. 1922.

Preston, named for Samuel W. Preston, was laid down 19 July 1919 by the Bethlehem Shipbuilding Corporation, San Francisco, California; launched 7 August 1920; sponsored by Mrs. Addie Worth Bagley Daniels, wife of the Secretary of the Navy; and commissioned 13 April 1921. Following shakedown, the flush-decked destroyer remained on the west coast on temporary duty. Until December 1921, she conducted exercises out of San Diego, California, then got underway for assignment with the Atlantic Fleet Destroyer Force. With that force for most of her naval career, she operated along the east coast, regularly sailing south for winter exercises in the Caribbean. In June 1925 she interrupted that schedule for a tour with US Naval Forces in European Waters. On that tour she cruised from the waters off Scandinavia to the Mediterranean. In July 1926, she returned to New York and resumed her former schedule of east coast and Caribbean employment.

== Fate ==
Preston was decommissioned at Philadelphia 1 May 1930 and was assigned to the Norfolk Navy Yard for strength tests. Her name was struck from the Navy List 6 November 1931 and on 23 August 1932 her hull was sold for scrap.
