= USS Preston (DD-795) =

Fletcher-class destroyer

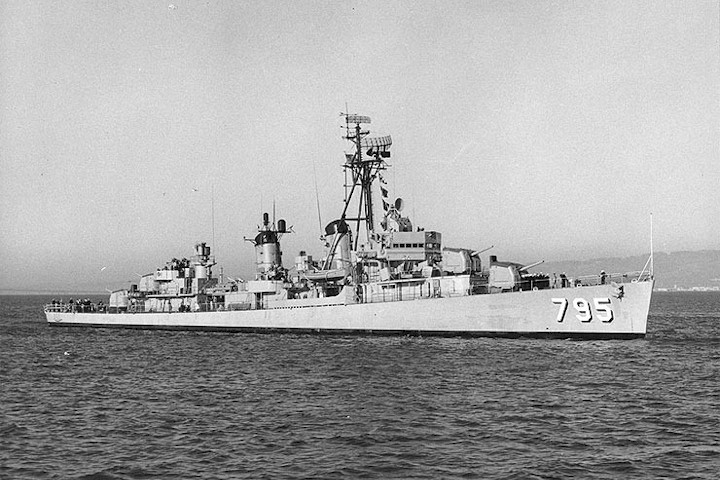
- USS Preston (DD-795) Off the San Francisco Bay Naval Shipyard, Hunters Point, California, 22 October 1966.

History

United States
- Namesake: Samuel W. Preston
- Builder: Bethlehem Shipbuilding, San Pedro, Los Angeles
- Laid down: 13 June 1943
- Launched: 12 December 1943
- Commissioned: 20 March 1944
- Decommissioned: 15 November 1969
- Stricken: 15 November 1969
- Fate: Transferred to Turkey, 15 November 1969

Turkey
- Name: İçel (D 344)
- Acquired: 15 November 1969
- Stricken: 1981
- Fate: Broken up for scrap in 1981

General characteristics
- Class & type: Fletcher-class destroyer
- Displacement: 2,940 tons
- Length: 376.5 ft (114.8 m)
- Beam: 39.3 ft (12.0 m)
- Draft: 17.8 ft (5.4 m)
- Propulsion: 60,000 shp (45 MW); 2 propellers
- Speed: 35 knots (65 km/h; 40 mph)
- Range: 6500 nmi. (12,000 km); @ 15 kt
- Complement: 320
- Armament: 5 × 5 in (130 mm), 10 × 40 mm AA guns, 7 × 20 mm AA guns, 10 × 21 inch (533 mm) torpedo tubes, 6 × depth charge posts, 2 × depth charge tracks

USS Preston (DD-795), a Fletcher-class destroyer, was the sixth ship of the United States Navy to be named for Lieutenant Samuel W. Preston (1840–1865).

Preston was laid down by the Bethlehem Shipbuilding, San Pedro, Los Angeles, 13 June 1943; launched 12 December 1943; sponsored by Mrs. R. F. Gross; and commissioned 20 March 1944, Commander G. S. Patrick in command.

== World War II ==
Following shakedown off California and extended exercises in Hawaiian waters, Preston departed Pearl Harbor, for the Marianas combat zone, 1 July 1944. On the 17th, she arrived off Guam and until 8 August screened the transport areas off the assault beaches. Two days in Apra harbor followed, after which she got underway for Eniwetok. On 29 August, she joined Task Force 38 (TF 38) and sailed west. Between 6 and 8 September, she screened the aircraft carriers during strikes against the Palaus; then, continuing on, guarded them during sorties against Japanese positions in the south and central Philippines. On completing runs on the 14th, she returned with the force to the Palaus to cover the landings on Peleliu and Angaur, then sailed back to the Philippines before retiring to Ulithi.

On 6 October, the force again sortied—this time to launch strikes preparatory to the invasion of the Philippines. After hitting the enemy's Formosan air bases, the force turned southeast for operations off Luzon in support of the Leyte landings. On 24 October, as the Japanese initiated a triple-pronged thrust to drive the Allied forces from Leyte Gulf, Preston's group, Task Group 38.3 (TG 38.3), came under severe attack in what was to be the first of the battles for Leyte Gulf. Wave after wave of bomber and torpedo planes closed the formation. Many were shot down, but Princeton (CVL-23) was lost. That evening TG 38.3 was ordered north to rendezvous with TG 38.2 and TG 38.4 and search for a Japanese carrier force. Within an hour of the midnight rendezvous search planes were flying. After daylight they caught the enemy force north of Cape Engaño and the fighting squadrons were sent off. In the afternoon the force's cruiser-destroyer group closed the surviving ships to deliver final blows. The force then retired to the south to join in the search for enemy vessels fleeing through San Bernardino Strait. On 27 October, sorties were flown to provide air cover for ground forces on Leyte after which the ships got underway for Ulithi.

By 5 November Preston was back in the operating area off Luzon as strikes were flown against enemy installations there. Anti-Japanese shipping runs in the central Philippines, particularly the Ormoc Bay area, followed and on 12 November the hammering of Luzon was resumed and repeated again on 25 November to 2 December and 10 to 21 December. On 30 December the force again steamed northwest from Ulithi, and after welcoming the new year, 1945, with raids on Formosa and the Nansei Shoto, supported the Lingayen assault. Then, passing through the Bashi Channel, the ships entered the South China Sea and blasted Japanese shipping and shore installations along the Indo-China coast. By 15 January they were off western Formosa and by the 19th had swung around to launch strikes against that island and Okinawa Gunto from the east. During February, Preston screened the carriers as their planes delivered devastating blows to industrial complexes on the Japanese home islands; provided air support for the assault troops on Iwo Jima; returned to Japan for further strikes on Tokyo, Nagoya, Osaka, and Kobe; and then sailed south for renewed raids against the next amphibious target, Okinawa.

Preston returned to Ulithi, where she was assigned to Task Force 54 (TF 54) for the invasion of Okinawa. Her group sailed for the Ryukyus, 21 March, to screen the bombardment and underwater demolition groups. Between 24 March and 1 April she operated off Kerama Retto, then shifted to fire support off the Hagushi beaches. Continuing fire support duty until June, she provided assistance for elements of the Tenth Army – the unique cross-branch force consisting of divisions of the US Army and the US Marine Corps Army and Marine Corps – during their assault on the Motobu Peninsula, where her fire enabled Marines to break out of their Japanese-ringed position; in the Nago Wan, Nakagusuku Wan, and Naha areas; and on Ie Shima and Kutaka Shima. In early June, she conducted patrols against suicide boats, then returned to fire support activities. In July, she patrolled off northern Okinawa on radar picket duty and, in August, escorted convoys in and out of the Buckner Bay area.

After the Japanese surrender, 14 August, Preston remained in the Okinawa area on air-sea rescue duty. On 6 September, she got underway for the United States, arriving at San Pedro, California on 24 September to begin inactivation. In November she shifted to San Diego where she decommissioned 24 April 1946 and was berthed as a unit of the Pacific Reserve Fleet.

== 1951 – 1969 ==
Reactivated following the outbreak of hostilities in Korea, Preston recommissioned 26 January 1951 and in April got underway for the east coast. Modernization at Philadelphia preceded a brief stay at her homeport of Newport. The ship lost one 5"/38 mount (#3) which was replaced by a new gun director. Other major changes in armaments, radars and other capabilities were made at this time. On 9 January 1952, she sailed eastward on her Mediterranean deployment. Returning from 6th Fleet duty in May, she participated in fleet and type training from Labrador to the Caribbean.

On 1 April 1953, she departed the New England coast for the Pacific and a return to combat in the Far East. Arriving in Japan in early May, she operated with the fast carrier force, TF 77, until June, then joined the UN Blockade and Escort Force, TF 95. With the signing of the truce 27 July, Preston got underway for Newport and, steaming via Suez, completed the round-the-world cruise, at Boston, in October. Overhaul followed and between May and September 1954 she operated with HUK (Hunter Killer) units of the Atlantic Fleet. In 1955 another Mediterranean deployment was followed by antisubmarine warfare (ASW) exercises and on 15 March 1956, she cleared Narragansett Bay and headed back to the west coast.

Assigned to Destroyer Squadron 23 (DesRon 23), Preston arrived at Long Beach 15 April and through May operated off the California coast. In June, she sailed west for her first peacetime Far East deployment and initiated a schedule of regular rotation between tours with the 7th Fleet in the western Pacific and 1st Fleet assignments; the former including SEATO and other Allied exercises and Taiwan patrol duty, and the latter including west coast training and cruises to the Arctic and to the central Pacific. In December 1958, Preston assisted the fire-ravaged Japanese town of Keniya by providing food and clothing. During 1962 she followed winter arctic operations with participation in nuclear tests in the milder climes of the Pacific. In March 1964 Preston deployed to the WestPac operational area with the 7th Fleet . Most of her time was spent in the South China Sea with brief visits to Japan. Joining TG 77.6 in late July she first went to Hong Kong and then left to the Tonkin Gulf following the first attack on the Maddox DD-731 on 2 August. The Carrier Task Group was led by Constellation CVA-64, which participated in the first counterattacks against North Vietnam. This action resulted in a Presidential Unit Commendation. Then in 1965 she deployed for the second time to the Vietnam combat area. Joining TG 77.5 on 12 August, she performed plane guard and screening duties for the carriers Coral Sea (CV-43) and Ticonderoga (CV-14), and provided gunfire support to ground troops until late 1968.

Preston was decommissioned and stricken from the Naval Vessel Register 15 November 1969.

Preston earned 6 battle stars during World War II and one during the Korean War. Presidential Unit Commendation awarded August 1964 for Tonkin Gulf action.

== TCG Icel ==
Preston was transferred to Turkey 15 November 1969, and renamed TCG İçel (D 344).

Icel was stricken and broken up for scrap in 1981.

== See also ==
- See USS Preston for other ships of the same name.
