= USS Bruce =

Clemson-class destroyer

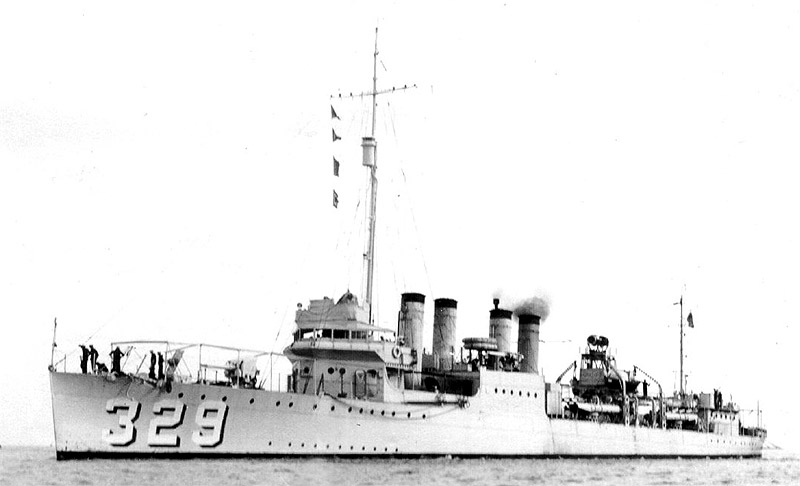
- USS Bruce (DD-329)

History

United States
- Name: Bruce
- Namesake: Frank Bruce
- Builder: Bethlehem Shipbuilding Corporation, Union Iron Works, San Francisco
- Cost: $1,048,888.87 (hull & machinery)
- Laid down: 30 July 1919
- Launched: 20 May 1920
- Commissioned: 29 September 1920
- Decommissioned: 1 May 1930
- Stricken: 6 November 1931
- Fate: Sold for scrap, 23 August 1932

General characteristics
- Class & type: Clemson-class destroyer
- Displacement: 1,215 tons
- Length: 314 ft 4 in (95.81 m)
- Beam: 31 ft 8 in (9.65 m)
- Draft: 9 ft 10 in (3.00 m)
- Propulsion: 26,500 shp (19,800 kW); Geared turbines; 2 screws
- Speed: 35 knots (65 km/h; 40 mph)
- Range: 4,900 nmi (9,100 km; 5,600 mi) at 15 knots (28 km/h; 17 mph)
- Complement: 122 officers and enlisted
- Armament: 4 × 4 in (102 mm)/50 guns; 1 × 3 in (76 mm)/25 gun; 12 × 21 in (533 mm) torpedo tubes

USS Bruce (DD-329) was a Clemson-class destroyer in the United States Navy following World War I.

== Namesake ==
Frank Bruce was born on 20 August 1879 in Grand Island, Nebraska. He entered the United States Navy as a boatswain on 6 February 1898 and was commissioned a lieutenant (temporary) on 1 July 1918. He commanded USS Bobolink during the North Sea Mine Barrage Sweep and was killed when a mine exploded 17 May 1919.

== History ==
Bruce was first launched on 20 May 1920 by Bethlehem Shipbuilding Corporation, San Francisco, California, sponsored by Mrs. Annie Bruce, the widow of Lieutenant Bruce. The vessel was commissioned on 29 September 1920.

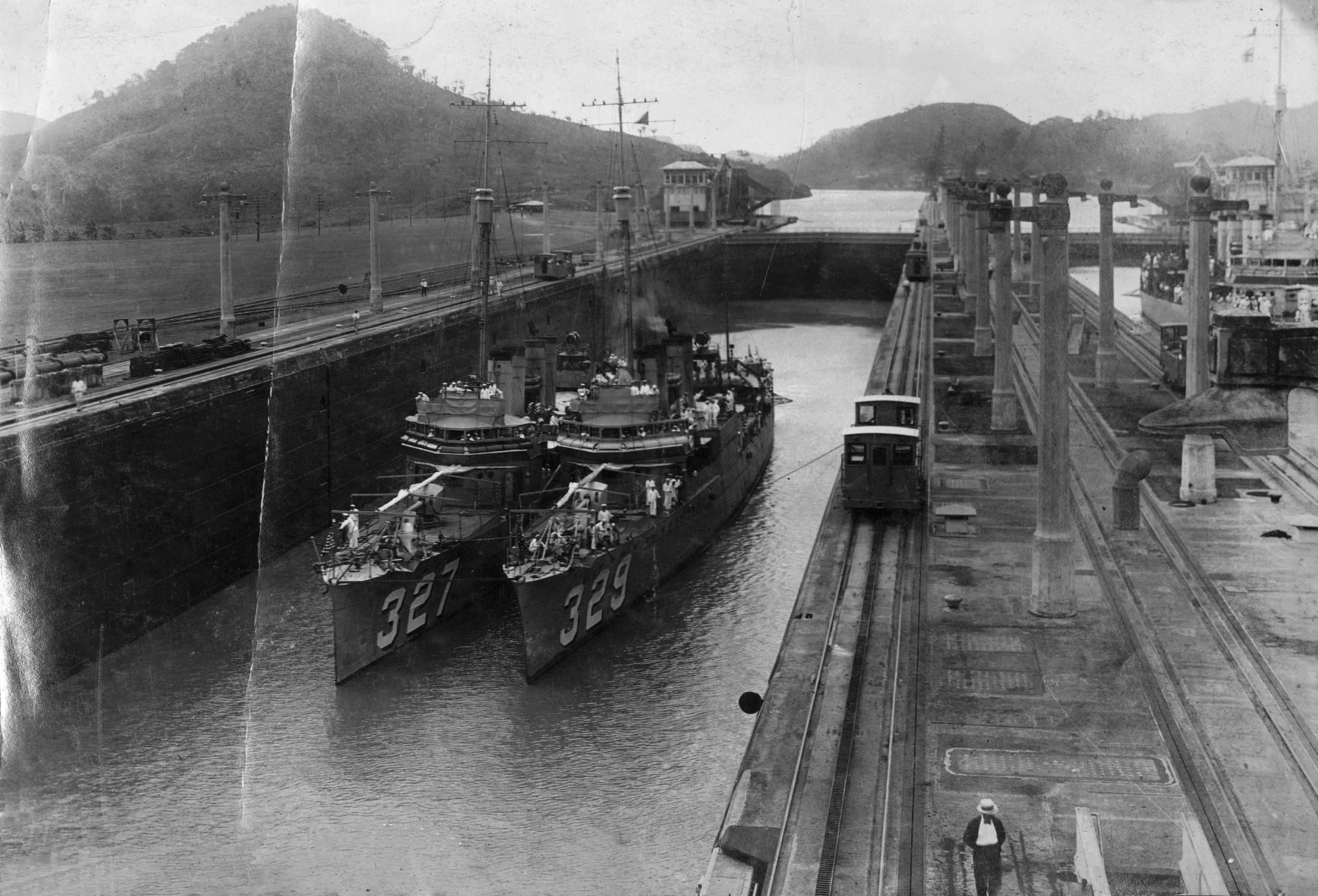
Bruce and Preston in the Pedro Miguel Locks, ca. 1922.

Bruce operated out of San Diego, California during her first year of service on engineering, gunnery, and torpedo exercises, and maneuvered with Squadron 5, Pacific Fleet. In November 1921 her home port was changed to Boston, Massachusetts and she reported to Division 27, Scouting Fleet. Her schedule of employment during succeeding years was the established routine of practice and fleet maneuvers. In December 1924 her commanding officer also assumed command of Destroyer Division 27. Her home yard was changed from Boston to Norfolk Navy Yard in June 1925. On 17 June, with her division, she sailed for duty with United States Naval Forces Europe. During the next year, naval forces operating in European waters cooperated with the State Department as a stabilizing influence in troubled regions and as security for American citizens living in these areas.

Upon her return to Norfolk Navy Yard she operated along the eastern seaboard and in Cuban and Haiti waters until March 1927. In March she participated in the Fleet Tactical Problem held at Colón, Panama, followed by the Fleet concentration along the Atlantic coast. During that summer she made training cruises with Naval Reservists along the northeastern seaboard. During 1928 and 1929 she continued to participate in fleet maneuvers and exercises along the east coast. On 11 June 1928, three civilian employees of the Norfolk Navy Yard were scalded to death while working in the number boiler room.

In September 1929 Bruce put in at Philadelphia Navy Yard, where on 1 May 1930, she was decommissioned. She was later towed to Norfolk Navy Yard where she was used for experimental strength tests, before scrapping. Her salvage metal was sold in August 1932.
