= ComServPac =

Unit of the US Navy

Service Force, United States Pacific Fleet, usually known as COMSERVPAC, was a service support command of the United States Pacific Fleet from 1942 until 1973. It was the reincarnation of the former Base Force. The Service Force comprised the supply train of the fleet which includes Oilers (AO), Gasoline Tanker (AOG), Repair Ships (AR), Ammunition Ships (AE), Destroyer Tenders (AD) and Submarine tenders (AS).

Service forces under the ComServPac were known as ServPac or SERVPAC.

From 1942, the early Service Force was organized around four squadrons: Two, Four, Six, and Eight.

- Squadron Two included hospital ships, fleet motion-picture exchange, repair ships, salvage ships, and tugs. Commander Service Squadron Two administered the following:
1. Fleet Motion Picture Exchange.
2. Administration of Hospital Ships and Mobile Hospitals.
3. Administration of Repair Ships and Tenders.
4. Mobile Salvage.
5. Fleet Mail.
6. Shore Patrol.
7. Fleet Personnel (through Service Force Subordinate Command).
- Squadron Four had the transports and the responsibility for training. This was the tiny nucleus of what eventually became the great Amphibious Force, or Forces.
- Squadron Six took care of all target-practice firing and of the towing of targets, both surface and aerial. Six also controlled the Fleet Camera Party, Target Repair Base, Anti-Aircraft School, Fleet Machine Gun School, and Small Craft Disbursing.
- Squadron Eight had the responsibility for the supply and distribution to the fleet of all its fuels, food, and ammunition.

In March 1942 the name was changed to Service Forces Pacific Fleet. Headquarters had already moved ashore from the USS Argonne (AS-10) to the Pearl Harbor Navy Yard, and later moved again to the new administration building of the Commander in Chief Pacific, in the Makalapa area outside the navy yard.

In 1973 cruisers, destroyers, amphibious ships, mine warfare vessels, and service ships in the Pacific Fleet all came under the command of Commander, Naval Surface Force Pacific. The ships of the modern day equivalent of the service force have gradually transferred from Naval Surface Force Pacific to the Military Sealift Command's Combat Logistics Force.

In 1984, Service Group 1 and Service Squadron 3 on the West Coast had a total of fifteen ships assigned (2 AFS, 2 AOE, 3 AOR, 1 AR, 7 AE). In addition, Service Squadron 5 at Pearl Harbor had another 2 ARS and 2 ATS.

By 1987, Service Squadron 3 had been disestablished and there were a total of fourteen service ships on the West Coast, plus five more in Service Squadron 5. By 2012, the Military Balance listed 5 Sacramento class fast combat support ships and Supply-class oilers (AOE) in regular U.S. Navy service, but 42 vessels in the Naval Fleet Auxiliary Force.

== Commanders ==
Former Commanders, Base Force, Pacific Fleet

- Rear Admiral William L. Calhoun USN (December 1939 – 27 February 1942)

Former Commanders, Service Force, Pacific Fleet

- Vice Admiral William L. Calhoun USN(27 February 1942 – 6 March 1945)
- Vice Admiral William W. Smith USN (6 March 1945 – 2 September 1945)
- Rear Admiral Francis C. Denebrink USN (1949–1953)
- Rear Admiral W.D. Irvin USN (1963–1965)
- Rear Admiral Edwin B. Hooper USN (1965–1968)
- Rear Admiral Walter V. Combs USN (1968)
- Vice Admiral John M. Barrett USN (1969–1971)
