= USS Preston (DD-379) =

Mahan-class destroyer

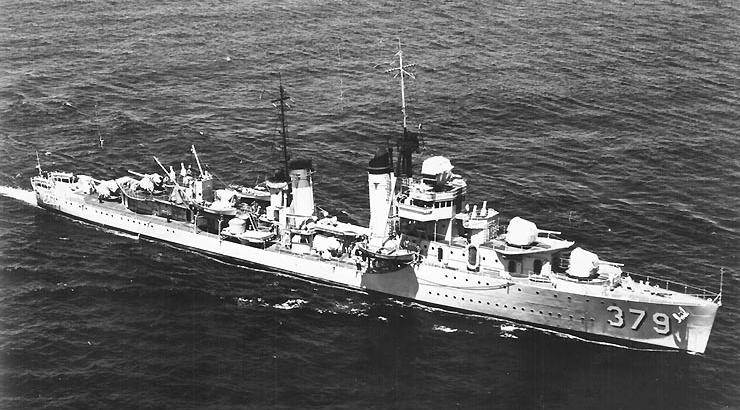
- USS Preston while underway in the late 1930s

History

United States
- Name: Preston
- Namesake: Samuel W. Preston
- Builder: Mare Island Navy Yard
- Laid down: 27 October 1934
- Launched: 22 April 1936
- Commissioned: 27 October 1936
- Fate: Sunk by the Japanese cruiser Nagara, 14 November 1942

General characteristics
- Class & type: Mahan-class destroyer
- Displacement: 1,500 tons
- Length: 341 ft 4 in (104.0 m)
- Beam: 35 ft 0 in (10.7 m)
- Draft: 9 ft 10 in (3.0 m)
- Speed: 37 knots (69 km/h; 43 mph)
- Complement: 158
- Armament: As built: 1 × Gun Director above bridge, 5 × 5" (127 mm)/38 cal DP (5x1), 12 × 21 in (533 mm) torpedo tubes (3x4), 4 × .50 cal (12.7 mm) MG AA (4x1), 2 × depth charge stern racks, c1942: 1 × Mk33 Gun Fire Control System, 4 × 5" (127 mm)/38cal DP (4x1), 12 × 21 in (533 mm) torpedo tubes (3x4), 2 × Mk51 Gun Directors, 4 × Bofors 40 mm AA (2x2), 6 × Oerlikon 20 mm AA (6x1), 2 × depth charge roll-off stern racks, 4 × K-gun depth charge projectors

USS Preston (DD–379) was a Mahan-class destroyer in the United States Navy before and during World War II. She was the fifth Navy ship named for Lieutenant Samuel W. Preston (1840–1865). She was sunk at the Second Naval Battle of Guadalcanal, 14 November 1942.

== Construction and commissioning ==
Preston was laid down on 27 October 1934 at the Mare Island Navy Yard in Vallejo, California. She was launched on 22 April 1936, sponsored by Mrs. Edward H. Campbell, and commissioned on 27 October 1936.

== Service history ==
Following shakedown, Preston operated briefly under the Chief of Naval Operations, then joined Battle Force, U.S. Fleet. Initially assigned to Destroyer Squadron 2 (DesRon 2), then shifted to DesRon 5, she conducted peacetime training exercises in the Pacific until 7 December 1941. Patrol and coastal escort duties along the west coast kept Preston in the eastern Pacific until 1 June 1942. Then setting a westward course she headed for Hawaii in the screen of the aircraft carrier Saratoga. Arriving on 6 June, her group, TG 11.1, departed again the next day to rendezvous with Task Force 17 (TF17) and deliver planes, pilots, and material to the carriers Enterprise and Hornet as that force refueled and rested after the Battle of Midway.

On 13 June, Preston returned to Pearl Harbor and for the next four months conducted type exercises and performed patrol and escort work in the Hawaiian area. She joined TF 16 on 4 October, and on 15 October sailed for the Solomon Islands. On 24 October, TF 16 rendezvoused with TF 17, formed TF 61, and continued on. Two days later, Preston, in the carrier screen, introduced her guns to the enemy at the Battle of the Santa Cruz Islands. Downing two planes, she emerged unscathed from her first engagement and retired to Nouméa.

Rearmed, she headed back to the Solomons for her second and last fight.

== Final battle ==
On the evening of 14 November, Preston, with TF 64, sailed along the western end of Guadalcanal to intercept another Japanese run down the "Slot" to bombard Henderson Field and land reinforcements. Swinging around Savo Island, the force, two battleships preceded by four destroyers, entered the channel between Savo and Cape Esperance. At 23:00, the battleship Washington picked up the Japanese cruiser Sendai on her radar, and, at 23:17, the Third Battle of Savo Island began.

Sendai, accompanied by the destroyer Shikinami, had been following the Americans, but 16-inch (406 mm) projectiles drove them off. Soon after, however, the battle was rejoined. The Japanese force had been dispersed and within minutes of the battleship/cruiser encounter, enemy destroyers, edging along the southern shore of Savo, entered the fray. USS Benham and Preston followed. Gwin, which had been firing illumination shells toward the earlier gunfire exchange, came into the action in time to sight the cruiser Nagara and four destroyers closing in. Farther out, heavier Japanese ships were preparing to join in. The concentrated American destroyers were now central targets and, approximately eight minutes after the enemy was engaged, USS Walke was hit.

== Loss ==
Soon after this, Preston opened fire on an illuminated enemy target and was fired on in return by the light cruiser Nagara, probably using the 5-inch gun flashes to target her. Preston was straddled by the first salvo and hit by the second whilst preparing her torpedoes for launching. The salvo from Nagara had put both firerooms out and toppled the afterstack.

Preston's fires made an easier target and shells came in from both port and starboard; there is the possibility that the shells coming in from port were from a friendly ship, most likely Washington, which was off to port of Preston had a broken gun mount causing one of her guns to hang low.

As the crippled Preston coasted to a halt, Nagara's next salvos landed on the destroyer's aft section, likely hitting the after 5-inch magazine, with catastrophic results. Survivor testimony from Robert B Reed (on damage control duties during the battle) describes the ship's torpedoes as having been smashed to bits by the explosion, with "loose and ruptured torpedo warheads rolling around under the mounts" and "with the exposed TNT on fire". As he recovered from the explosion, Reed became aware that "Canned goods, potatoes, cabbage and all manner of food provisions were falling straight down out of the sky, having been propelled upward by the explosion of the after magazines". The fires continued to spread.

At 23:36, Preston was ordered abandoned. Minutes later, she rolled on her port side. She floated for another ten minutes, bow in the air; then sank, taking 116 of her crew with her. Prior to the battle, Her skipper, Max C. Stormes wisely had all of the tetryl boosters for Preston's depth charges thrown overboard to prevent detonation should the ship go down. This decision no doubt saved many lives. Sadly, as the survivors drew clear of their sinking ship, the battleship USS South Dakota then appeared out of the darkness and steamed through the men in the water. A liferaft was apparently thrown by the South Dakota's crew, but Captain Stormes was not seen again after the battleship's passage.

The battle continued: Gwin, Walke, and Benham were all heavily damaged, with Walke soon following Preston to the Savo Sound graveyard. The two remaining destroyers were ordered to retire, but Benham would also sink on the 15th. In the ensuing climactic battleship action, South Dakota was exposed by searchlight and bore the brunt of heavy enemy fire. Washington then rejoined the fray and quickly inflicted overwhelming and fatal damage to the Japanese battleship Kirishima (the core of the bombardment force) while herself remaining unscathed. The Japanese had again scored heavily, but in doing so had lost a battleship and a destroyer, and, more important, had abandoned their mission of bombarding Henderson Field into uselessness.

== Awards ==
Preston earned two battle stars for World War II service.
