= USS Bobolink (AM-20) =

Lapwing-class minesweeper

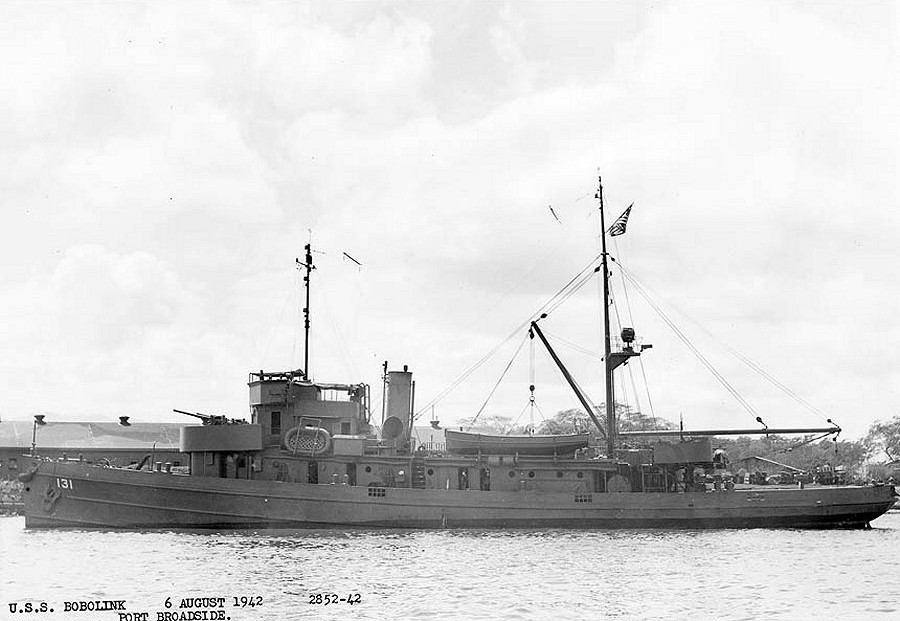
- Bobolink at Pearl Harbor, August 6, 1942

History

United States
- Name: USS Bobolink
- Builder: Baltimore Dry Dock and Shipbuilding Company, Baltimore, Maryland
- Cost: $761,959 (hull & machinery)
- Launched: 15 June 1918
- Commissioned: 28 January 1919, as Minesweeper No.20
- Decommissioned: 22 February 1946
- Reclassified: AM-20, 17 July 1920; AT-131, 1 June 1942; ATO-131, 15 May 1944
- Honours and awards: 1 battle star (World War II)
- Fate: Sold, 5 October 1946

General characteristics
- Class & type: Lapwing-class minesweeper
- Displacement: 950 long tons (965 t)
- Length: 187 ft 10 in (57.25 m)
- Beam: 35 ft 6 in (10.82 m)
- Draft: 9 ft 9 in (2.97 m)
- Speed: 14 knots (26 km/h; 16 mph)
- Complement: 72
- Armament: 2 × 3 in (76 mm) guns

USS Bobolink (AM-20/AT-131/ATO-131) was a Lapwing-class minesweeper acquired by the United States Navy for the dangerous task of removing mines from minefields laid in the water to prevent ships from passing.

Bobolink was launched on 15 June 1918 by Baltimore Dry Dock and Shipbuilding Company, in Baltimore, Maryland; sponsored by Miss Elsie Jean Willis; and commissioned 28 January 1919, with Lieutenant Frank Bruce in command.

== World War I minefield clearance ==
Bobolink departed Norfolk, Virginia in April 1919 to join Division 2, North Sea Minesweeping Detachment, at Kirkwall, Orkney Islands. While sweeping in the North Sea on 14 May 1919, a mine exploded close by, causing considerable damage to the stern and killing Bruce, Frank M., LT. USS Bruce (DD-329) was named after Lt. Bruce. Her repairs at the Devonport Dockyard, England, took six months.

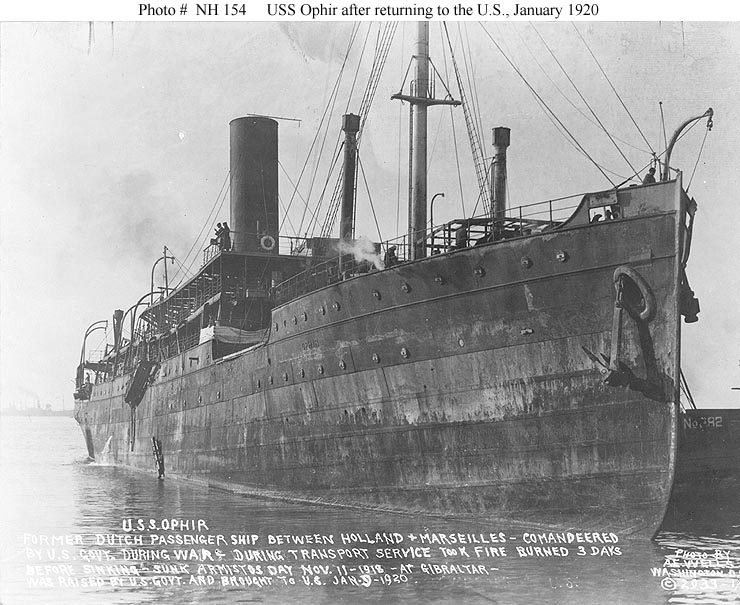
USS Ophir, which Bobolink towed from Bermuda to Cape Henry

In January 1920 she returned to Norfolk. En route she came to the aid of USS Ophir off Bermuda. Bobolink towed Ophir until a storm broke the tow rope about 100 nautical miles (190 km) off Cape Henry.

== Postwar operations ==
Between 1920 and 1931, Bobolink served with the Fleet Base Force, Scouting Fleet, on the East Coast of the United States and took part in fleet problems, concentrations, and joint Army-Navy maneuvers. On 3 March 1932, she arrived on the West Coast of the United States and was thereafter based at San Diego. She operated along the western seaboard between San Francisco and San Quentin Bay, Mexico, with the Fleet Train and various destroyer divisions. In 1935, she took part in the annual exercises and fleet problems held off Hawaii. Between January and March 1939, she participated in fleet problems in the Caribbean and then returned to San Diego, arriving there on 13 May 1939.

== World War II operations ==
In September 1940, Bobolink joined the Train, Base Force, United States Fleet, at Pearl Harbor. She remained there until September 1942. Bobolink was present during the Japanese attack on Pearl Harbor on 7 December 1941, laying in dock next to six destroyers near the district HQ. Following the attack, she served as a salvage vessel and minesweeper. Between 20 May and 2 July 1942, she was converted to an ocean-going tug (redesignated AT-131 on 1 June 1942). Remaining at Pearl Harbor until September 1942, Bobolink then steamed to the South Pacific and operated out off Guadalcanal, Solomon Islands; Espiritu Santo, New Hebrides; and Noumea, New Caledonia, as a tug until February 1944. In particular, she helped rescue survivors and assisted several crippled U.S. warships in the aftermath of the Naval Battle of Guadalcanal. She arrived at Long Beach, California, 4 March 1944 for overhaul and returned to Pearl Harbor on 29 June 1944. Bobolink was reclassified ATO-131 on 15 May 1944.

== Decommissioning ==
She served in Hawaiian waters until the fall of 1945, and then returned to Mare Island Navy Yard, where she was decommissioned 22 February 1946. She was sold through the Maritime Commission 5 October 1946.

Bobolink received one battle star for operations during World War II.
