= USS Fresno (LST-1182) =

Newport-class tank landing ship

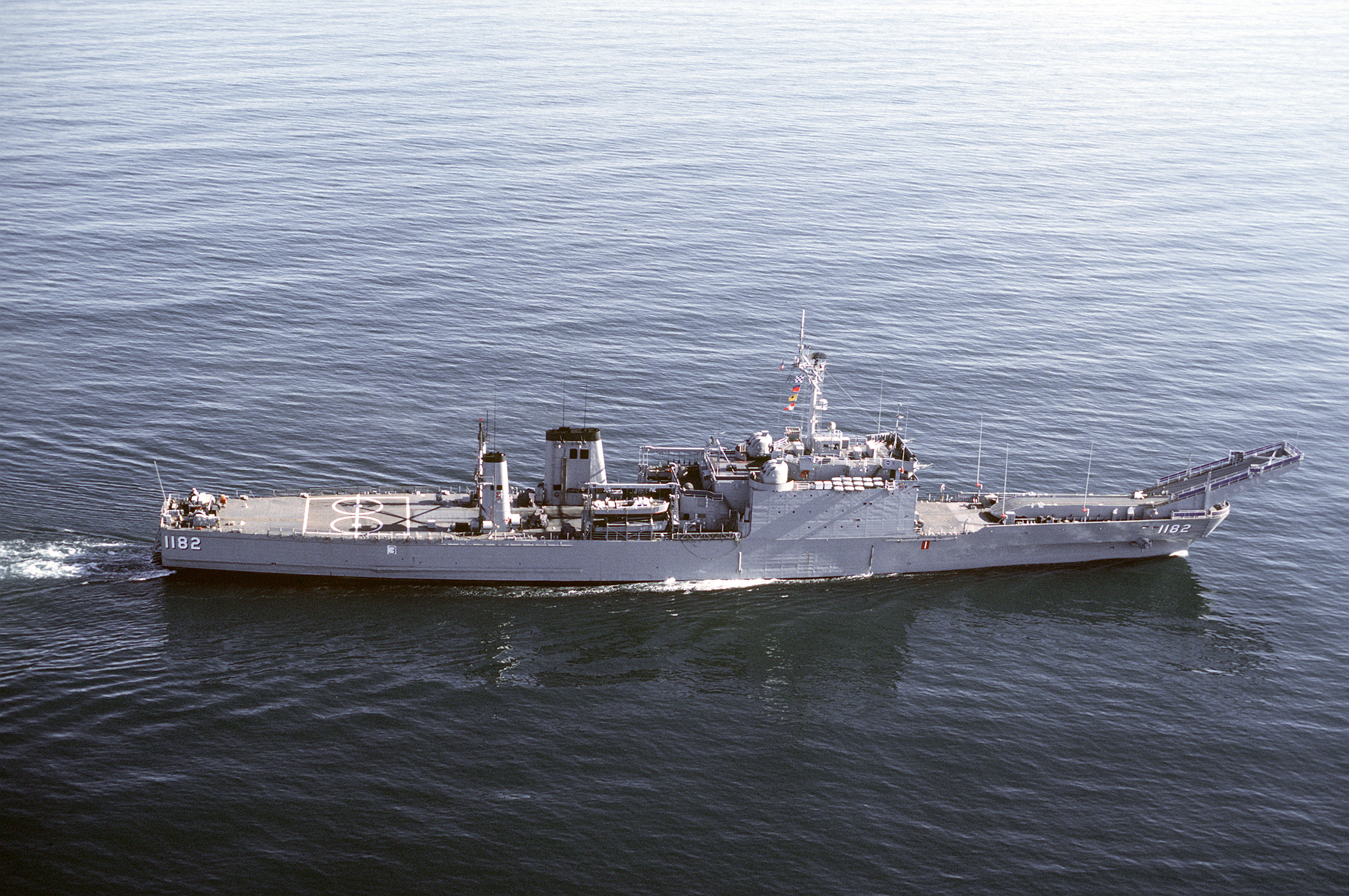
- USS Fresno underway on 1 November 1983

History

United States
- Name: Fresno
- Namesake: Fresno, California
- Ordered: 15 July 1966
- Builder: National Steel and Shipbuilding Company, San Diego, California
- Laid down: 16 December 1967
- Launched: 28 September 1968
- Commissioned: 22 November 1969
- Decommissioned: 8 April 1993
- Identification: LST-1182
- Honors and awards: Two battle stars
- Fate: Disposed of in support of fleet training exercise, 15 September 2014

General characteristics as built
- Class & type: Newport-class tank landing ship
- Displacement: 4,793 long tons (4,870 t) light; 8,342 long tons (8,476 t) full load
- Length: 522 ft 4 in (159.2 m) oa; 562 ft (171.3 m) over derrick arms
- Beam: 69 ft 6 in (21.2 m)
- Draft: 17 ft 6 in (5.3 m) max
- Propulsion: 2 shafts; 6 Alco diesel engines (3 per shaft); 16,500 shp (12,300 kW); Bow thruster
- Speed: 22 knots (41 km/h; 25 mph) max
- Range: 2,500 nmi (4,600 km; 2,900 mi) at 14 knots (26 km/h; 16 mph)
- Troops: 431 max
- Complement: 213
- Sensors & processing systems: 2 × Mk 63 GCFS; SPS-10 radar
- Armament: 2 × twin 3"/50 caliber guns
- Aviation facilities: Helicopter deck

USS Fresno (LST-1182) was the fourth tank landing ship (LST) of the Newport class. Fresno was named for a county in California. The vessel was constructed by the National Steel and Shipbuilding Company in San Diego, California and launched in 1968. The ship entered service in 1969 and was assigned to the United States Pacific Fleet, taking part in training along the west coast and operational cruises to the western Pacific, taking part in the Vietnam War. Fresno was decommissioned in 1993 and laid up. The LST was nearly sold to Peru but remained in the U.S. inventory until 2014, when Fresno was sunk as a target ship in the Pacific Ocean during a training exercise off Guam.

== Design and description ==
Fresno was a Newport-class tank landing ship which were designed to meet the goal put forward by the United States amphibious forces to have a tank landing ship (LST) capable of over 20 knots (37 km/h; 23 mph). However, the traditional bow door form for LSTs would not be capable. Therefore, the designers of the Newport class came up with a design of a traditional ship hull with a 112-foot (34 m) aluminum ramp slung over the bow supported by two derrick arms. The 34-long-ton (35 t) ramp was capable of sustaining loads up to 75 long tons (76 t). This made the Newport class the first to depart from the standard LST design that had been developed in early World War II.

Fresno had a displacement of 4,793 long tons (4,870 t) when light and 8,342 long tons (8,476 t) at full load. The LST was 522 feet 4 inches (159.2 m) long overall and 562 ft (171.3 m) over the derrick arms which protruded past the bow. The vessel had a beam of 69 ft 6 in (21.2 m), a draft forward of 11 ft 5 in (3.5 m) and 17 ft 5 in (5.3 m) at the stern at full load.

Fresno was fitted with six Alco 16-645-ES diesel engines turning two shafts, three to each shaft. The system was rated at 16,500 brake horsepower (12,300 kW) and gave the ship a maximum speed of 22 knots (41 km/h; 25 mph) for short periods and could only sustain 20 knots (37 km/h; 23 mph) for an extended length of time. The LST carried 1,750 long tons (1,780 t) of diesel fuel for a range of 2,500 nautical miles (4,600 km; 2,900 mi) at the cruising speed of 14 knots (26 km/h; 16 mph). The ship was also equipped with a bow thruster to allow for better maneuvering near causeways and to hold position while offshore during the unloading of amphibious vehicles.

The Newport class were larger and faster than previous LSTs and were able to transport tanks, heavy vehicles and engineer groups and supplies that were too large for helicopters or smaller landing craft to carry. The LSTs have a ramp forward of the superstructure that connects the lower tank deck with the main deck and a passage large enough to allow access to the parking area amidships. The vessels are also equipped with a stern gate to allow the unloading of amphibious vehicles directly into the water or to unload onto a utility landing craft (LCU) or pier. At either end of the tank deck there is a 30 ft (9.1 m) turntable that permits vehicles to turn around without having to reverse. The Newport class has the capacity for 500 long tons (510 t) of vehicles, 19,000 ft^{2} (1,800 m^{2}) of cargo area and could carry up to 431 troops. The vessels also have davits for four vehicle and personnel landing craft (LCVPs) and could carry four pontoon causeway sections along the sides of the hull.

Fresno was initially armed with four Mark 33 3-inch (76 mm)/50 caliber guns in two twin turrets. The vessel was equipped with two Mk 63 gun control fire systems (GCFS) for the 3-inch guns, but these were removed in 1977–1978. The ship also had SPS-10 surface search radar. Atop the stern gate, the vessels mounted a helicopter deck. They had a maximum complement of 213 including 11 officers.

== Construction and career ==
The LST was ordered as part of the second group of Newport-class ships in Fiscal Year 1966 on 15 July 1966 and was laid down on 16 December 1967 at San Diego, California, by the National Steel and Shipbuilding Company. Named for a county in California, Fresno was launched on 28 September 1968, sponsored by Mrs. Marilyn Hyde, the wife of the mayor of Fresno, California. The vessel was commissioned into the United States Navy on 22 November 1969.

Fresno was assigned to the Amphibious Force, Pacific Fleet, and homeported at San Diego. The LST alternated between training operations along the west coast of the United States and regular deployments to the western Pacific. The ship saw extensive service during the latter stages of the Vietnam War and earned two battle stars. Fresno was decommissioned on 8 April 1993 and was struck from the United States Naval Vessel Register on 1 December 2008. In 2009, along with Racine, Fresno was reported to be sold to the Peruvian Navy. However, this Foreign Military Sales (FMS) case was never executed and the ship remained under the control of the U.S. Navy following its decommissioning. On 15 September 2014, ex-Fresno was sunk as a target ship in waters 18,000 feet (5,500 m) deep, 215 nautical miles (398 km; 247 mi) northeast of Guam as part of the naval exercise Exercise Valiant Shield 2014. Ex-Fresno was struck by various weapons systems, including GBU-12 Paveway II bombs dropped by Boeing B-52 Stratofortress aircraft from the 96th Bomb Squadron.

== See also ==
- List of ships sunk by missiles
