= Edwin B. Hooper =

US Navy admiral (1909-1986)

Vice admiral Edwin Bickford Hooper
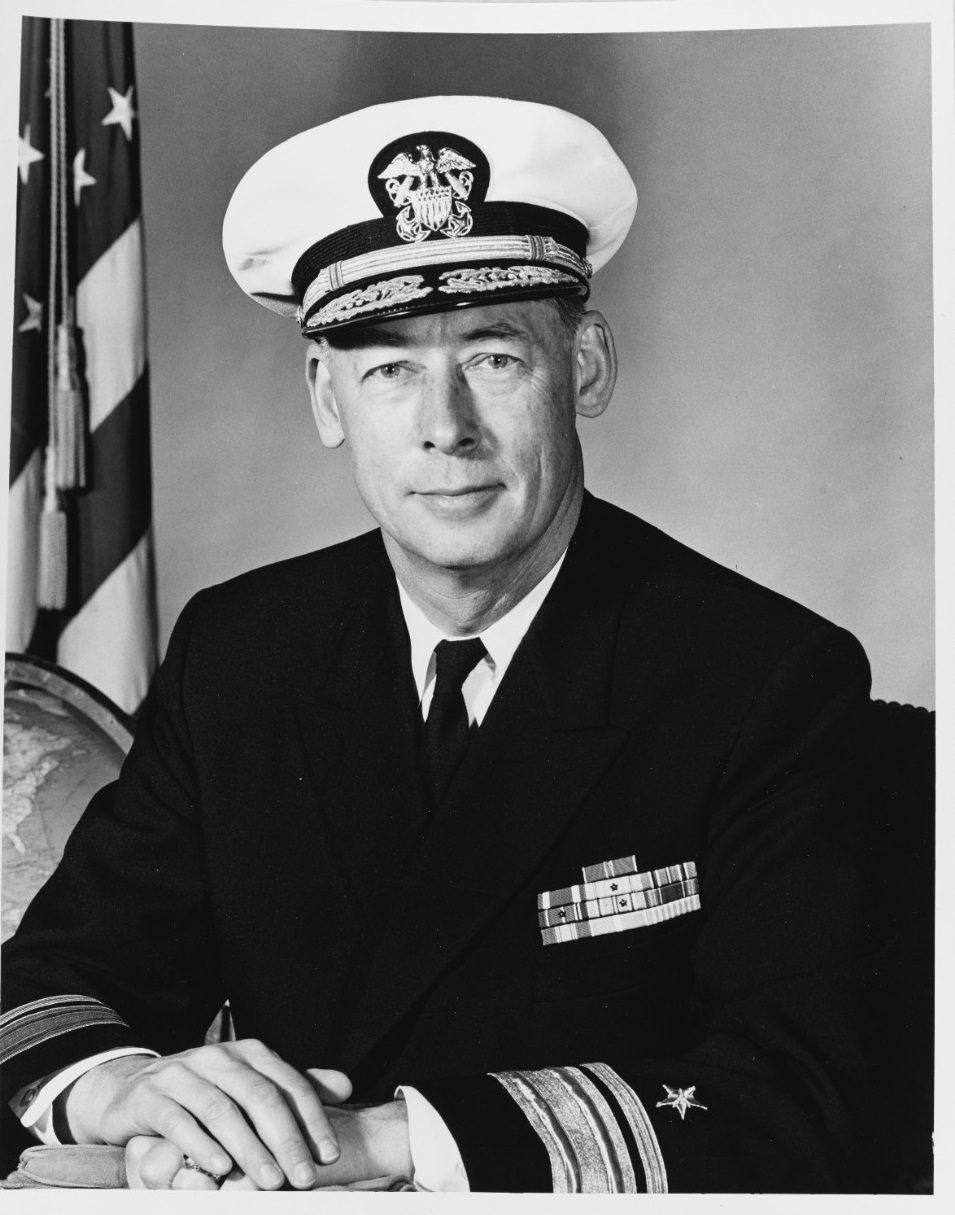
- Hooper as Rear admiral in 1965.
- Born: February 12, 1909; Winthrop, Massachusetts, US
- Died: September 26, 1986 (aged 77); Annapolis, Maryland, US
- Military career
- Allegiance: United States
- Branch: United States Navy
- Service years: 1931–1970
- Rank: Vice Admiral
- Conflicts: World War II; Korean War; Vietnam War
- Awards: Bronze Star Medal; Distinguished Service Medal (US Navy); Legion of Merit; National Defense Service Medal; European-African-Middle Eastern Campaign Medal; Asiatic-Pacific Campaign Medal; Korean Service Medal; United Nations Service Medal; Vietnam Service Medal

Edwin Bickford Hooper (February 26, 1909 – September 12, 1986) was a vice admiral of the United States Navy—his naval service spanned 5 decades from 1930 to the 1970. He served in World War II, Korean and Vietnam Wars and made important contributions to gunnery, ship operations, ordnance, amphibious operations, military logistics and study of naval history. He directed the gunfire in an important battleship-against-battleship action in 1942; was involved in the early days of United States Atomic Energy Commission; established the navy's long range study group; led the Service Force during the Vietnam war; and was the navy's historian—writing several navy histories including the first volume on the Vietnam War.

== Early life and naval career ==
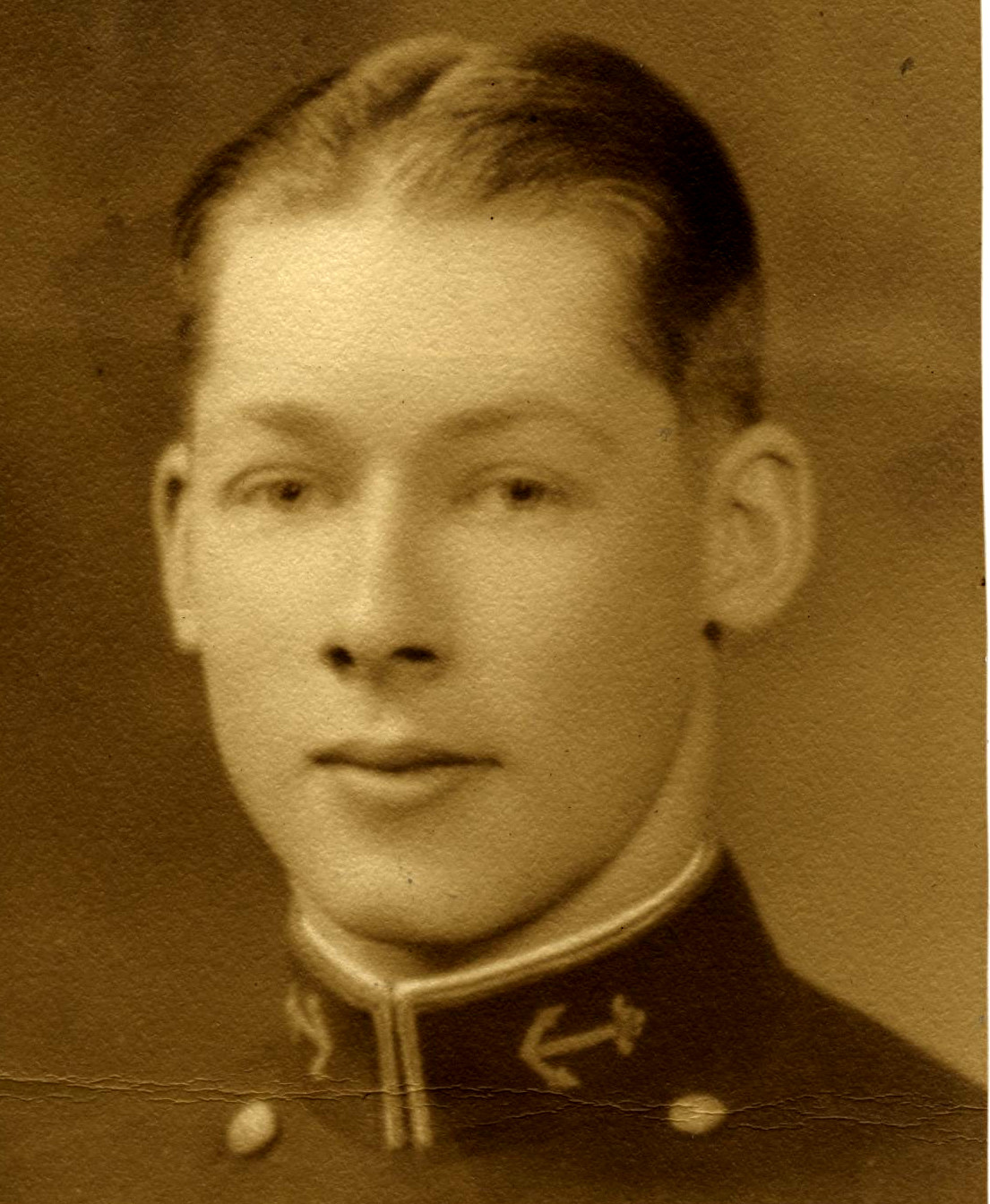
Edwin Hooper. Taken in 1930 while attending the U.S. Naval Academy

Hooper was born in Winthrop, Massachusetts, in a house across the street from the Winthrop Yacht Club, where his father owned a yawl. His parents were Fred A. Hooper and Flora Foster. He attended Huntington High School and then the United States Naval Academy from 1927 to 1931. Hooper served on USS Pensacola (CA-24) from 1931 to 1936. In 1934, he married Elizabeth Withers Patrick, daughter of Captain Bower Reynolds Patrick (a navy chaplain) and sister of G. S. Patrick.

From 1936 to 1938, Hooper served on the USS Cushing (DD-376).

In 1939, Hooper attended Naval Academy Post-Graduate School and took a newly established fire control ordnance course. In 1940, he attended the Massachusetts Institute of Technology, studied servo-mechanisms and received a master's degree in engineering. Students in his class included three important naval officers: Alfred G. Ward, Horacio Rivero Jr. and Lloyd Mustin.

== World War II – gunnery ==
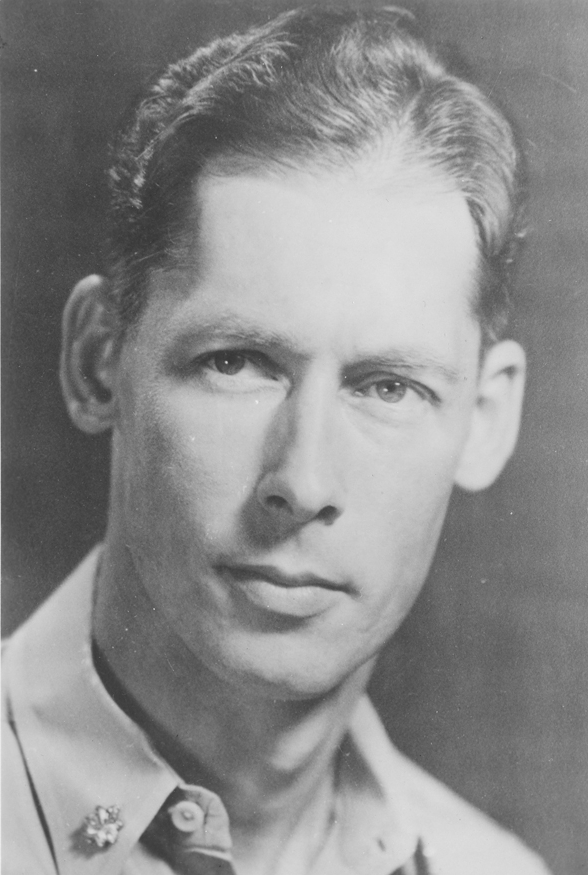
Hooper pictured during World War II as a commander.

In 1941, Hooper served on the USS Washington (BB-56) developing and improving fire control techniques to aim the gunfire of the 16 inch and 5 inch guns. During the night action off Guadalcanal (14 November 1942 – 15 November 1942) (Guadalcanal Campaign ), Hooper served as assistant gunnery officer and directed the fire of 16-inch and 5-inch guns. The USS Washington sank the Japanese battleship Kirishima, using primarily 16-inch gunfire, and simultaneously engaged the Japanese cruiser Atago, using 5-inch gunfire. The Atego was damaged and returned to Japan for repairs. In the months before the battle, Hooper had uncovered and corrected small systematic errors in the fire control of the 16-inch guns and, as a result, very accurate naval gunfire led to the rapid sinking of the Kirishima. Hooper was awarded the Bronze Star for the Guadalcanal Battle, was promoted and made gunnery officer on the USS Washington – the most junior U.S. officer to hold that position in World War II.

In 1944, Hooper served as gunnery officer on the USS Alaska (CB-1). In 1945 while on the USS Alaska, Hooper suffered a series of heart attacks and, after his recovery, became officer in charge of ordnance, maintenance, and improvement on the staff of Commander, Service Force, United States Pacific Fleet.

== Atomic Energy Commission, underway replenishment, and ordnance (nuclear) ==
From 1947 to 1949, Hooper was assigned to the Military Applications Group of the United States Atomic Energy Commission. He was involved in gaining approval for the 1948 Eniwetok tests (Operation Sandstone ) and attended one of the tests. From 1949 to 1950, Hooper was assigned as captain of the USS Waccamaw(AO-19) a fleet oiler. As captain, Hooper developed and tested techniques for resupplying ships in high seas and cold waters off Baffin Island and Greenland. From 1950 to 1952, Hooper was assistant for nuclear applications in Bureau of Ordnance and was responsible for developing the Mark 8 nuclear bomb and the Mark 90 nuclear bomb, which could be flown on navy aircraft. In 1952 and 1953, Hooper attended the National War College.

== Korean War, ordnance (conventional) and naval studies ==
From 1953 to 1954, Hooper was Chief of Staff for the Destroyer Flotilla Three stationed in Japan. The Flotilla had 78 destroyers; many of which were operating off Korea. The Flotilla was under the command of Rear Admiral William K. Mendenhall Jr. Since Mendenhall was involved in Korean armistice negotiations at Pan Mun Jom, Hooper operated the Flotilla on a day-to-day basis. From 1954 to 1955, Hooper was captain of the a destroyer tender USS Sierra (AD-18).

From 1955-1958, Hooper was assigned to Bureau of Ordnance for Research as Assistant Chief. Hooper guided the development of ASROC, an anti-submarine missile system, and the Mark 37 Torpedo. Hooper gained approval for the development of the AIM-9 Sidewinder.

From 1958-1959, Hooper was commander of Destroyer Squadron 26, which was stationed in Norfolk, Virginia, and, from 1959 to 1961, was first director of the Institute of Naval Studies in Newport, Rhode Island. This institute conducted studies into long-range operations and goals of the U.S. Navy.

== Vietnam War – amphibious operations and logistics ==
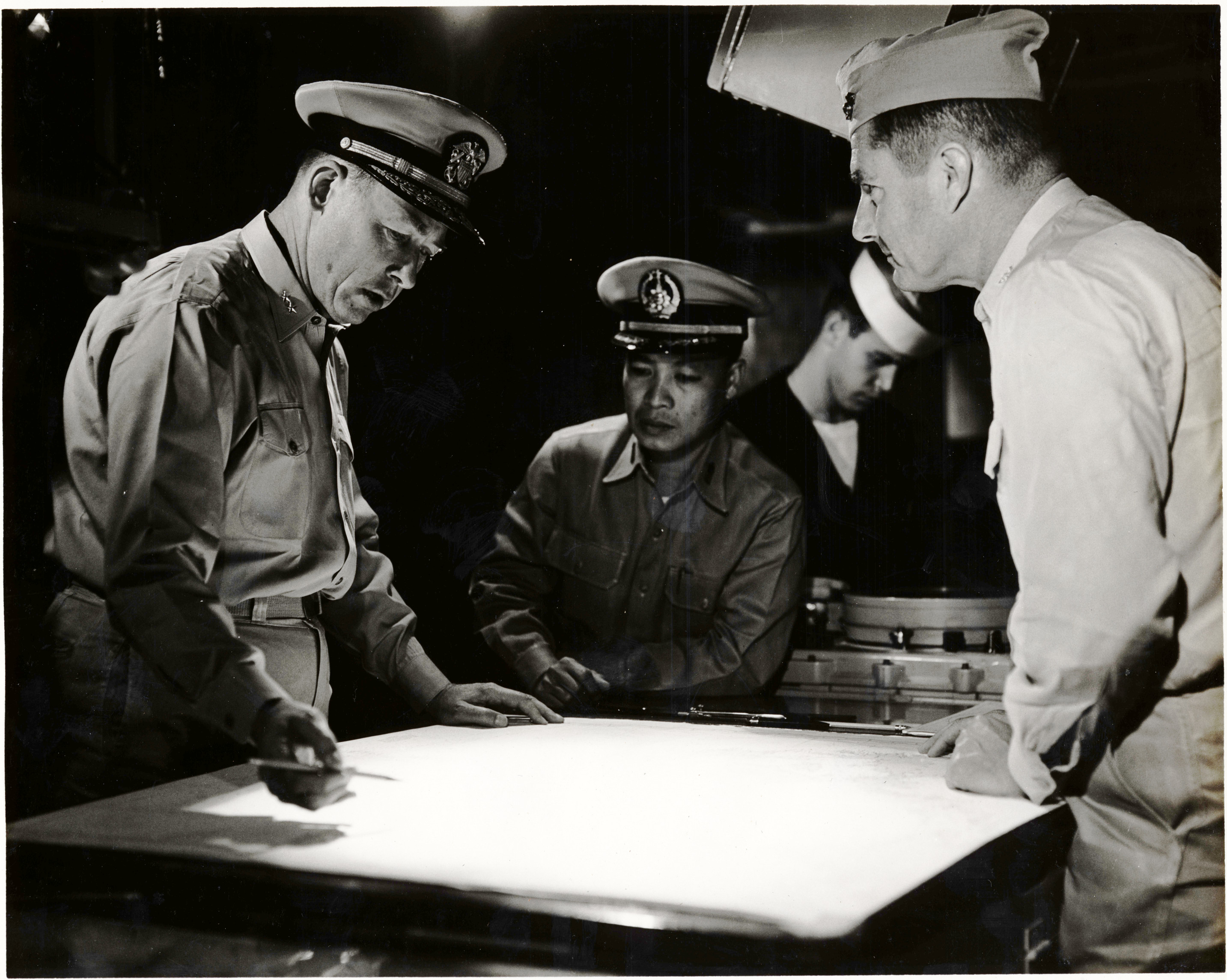
Controlling Exercise Tulungan on board USS Eldorado, March 1962. From left, Hooper, Cdr Jose Vasquey (Philippine Navy), unnamed, Col. T. A. Culhane (USMC).

From 1961 to 1962, Hooper was the Commander of Amphibious Group One in the Pacific and a key member of the staff was Phil H. Bucklew. Initially, the command was located in Coronado, California, and, during this period, a training Exercise Seawall in Washington State was conducted the Army's 4th Division. In 1962, the command was transferred to Subic Bay PI and Hooper was Operational Commander of the SEATO Exercise Tulungan. Tulungan involved landing U.S. Marines and Philippine Army units into Mindanao PI and was, in many ways, a final training exercise before the Vietnam War. The military commanders ( Rear Admiral Miller, Brigadier general Ormond R. Simpson, Vice Admiral Blackburn and General Robert E. Cushman, Jr. ) and some of the troops were later involved in the war. During the exercise, troops were landed by boat, aircraft and helicopter – testing techniques used in the Vietnam War. During 1962, there was a low level conflict in New Guinea between the Dutch and Indonesia and the amphibious group wrote contingency plans to support evacuations.

From 1962 to 1965, Hooper worked in the Office of the Naval Operations in research and development. Hooper was part of the team that negotiated the establishment of the Atlantic Undersea Test and Evaluation Center (AUTEC).

In 1965, Hooper became commander of the Service Force for the Pacific ComServPac. As the principal logistics agent for the Commander in Chief, U.S. Pacific Fleet, Hooper commanded over 56,000 navy personnel who manned more than 128 ships, 22,000 non-military personnel, 14 overseas shore activities including Naval Support Activity Saigon and numerous other mobile support units and staffs of the Pacific Service Force. The command had 78 types of ships – underway replenishment ships, repair ships, salvage ships, survey ships, hospital ships, and icebreakers. Hooper help establish and operate the major logistical bases in Danang, Chu Lai and Cam Ranh Bay that supported both army and marine forces in Vietnam. The USS Pueblo, when it was captured, was nominally under the command of the Service Force.

== Navy's historian and last years ==
In 1968, Hooper returned to Washington, D.C., worked in the Office of Naval Operations, and then as a senior member of the Joint Logistics Review Board, which studied logistics in the Vietnam War. During this time he was promoted to vice admiral. In 1970, Hooper retired from active navy duty and returned on limited duty as the navy's historian. Hooper co-authored the first volume of the navy's history of the Vietnam War. When Hooper finally retired in 1976, Admiral Hyman G. Rickover sent Hooper a letter, which stated that "One of the most worthwhile aspects of my duty in Washington has been know a man as intelligent, kind, sincere, competent, and helpful as you." After retiring, Hooper wrote a book on the use of naval power, which was published after his death in 1986. A small scholarship fund was established in his name.
