= USS Preston =

Six ships in the United States Navy have been named USS Preston for Samuel W. Preston.

- USS Preston (1864) was captured in 1864, commissioned in 1865 and decommissioned later that same year.
- USS Preston (1865) was captured in 1865 and sold in 1868.
- USS Preston (DD-19) was commissioned in 1909 and decommissioned in 1919.
- USS Preston (DD-327) was commissioned in 1921 and decommissioned in 1930.
- USS Preston (DD-379) was commissioned in 1936 and sunk in November 1942.
- USS Preston (DD-795) was commissioned in 1944 and transferred to Turkey in 1969.

== See also ==
- USS William B. Preston
