= Preston High School =

Preston High School is the name of several high schools:

In Canada:

- Preston High School (Ontario) in Cambridge, Ontario

In the United Kingdom:

- City of Preston High School in Preston, Lancashire, England

In the United States:

- Preston High School (Idaho) in Preston, Idaho (known as the Napoleon Dynamite high school)
- Preston High School (Iowa) in Preston, Iowa
- Preston High School (Oklahoma) in Preston, Oklahoma
- Preston High School (Maryland), former high school in Preston, Maryland
- Preston High School (New York City) in the Bronx borough of New York City
- Preston High School (West Virginia) in Kingwood, West Virginia, serving Preston County
- Lake Preston High School in Lake Preston, South Dakota

In Australia

- Preston High School (Victoria) in Preston, Victoria (opening 2019)
