= Preston Street =

Preston Street may refer to:

- Preston Street (Ottawa)
- Preston Street (Baltimore)
- A section of Kentucky Route 61
