= Preston, North Carolina =

Preston is a neighborhood located in Cary, North Carolina. It is located near several public schools, including Morrisville Elementary School and Green Hope High School, as well as Prestonwood Country Club, which hosts the annual SAS Championship.
