= G. S. Patrick =

Goldsborough Serpell Patrick (26 April 1907 – 21 March 1999) was a rear admiral in the United States Navy.

== Biography ==
Patrick was born Goldsborough Serpell Patrick on Goat Island in San Francisco, California. He was the son of Jane Deakins Serpell of Norfolk, Virginia, and Navy Chaplain Capt Bower Reynolds Patrick. As a child he and his parents were briefly marooned in 1908 on Christmas Island — now Kiritimati – when the vessel they were traveling on, the Aeon, around on the reef, while in transit from San Francisco to Australia. Patrick returned to Christmas Island in 1956, as one of two US military observers, during Operation Grapple, a series of UK atomic bomb tests. He died 21 March 1999 in Virginia Beach, Virginia.

== Career ==
Patrick's first assignments were aboard the destroyers USS Augusta (CA-31), USS Pope (DD-225) and USS Farragut (DD-348).

On December 7, 1941, Patrick was stationed at Pearl Harbor. During the attack that day, his directive that moored ships store live ammunition in their gun mounts would help the U.S. resistance against the Imperial Japanese Navy. He later commanded the destroyer USS Preston (DD-795) during World War II from commissioning on 20 March 1944 until 20 September 1945 and participated in the Battles of Leyte Gulf, Iwo Jima and Okinawa.

Later, Patrick would command the battleship USS Wisconsin (BB-64) during the Korean War. Following the war, he was named Chief of the Military Assistance Advisory Group in the Netherlands and Inspector General of the Navy.

Awards he received include the Navy Cross, Bronze Star Medal with award star and the Legion of Merit.
