= Preston Township =

Preston Township may refer to the following townships in the United States:

- Preston Township, Richland County, Illinois
- Preston Township, Fillmore County, Minnesota
- Preston Township, Platte County, Missouri
- Preston Township, Pennsylvania

== See also ==
- Preston Lake Township, Renville County, Minnesota
