= HMS Preston =

Three ships of the Royal Navy have borne the name HMS Preston:

- English ship Preston was a 40-gun ship launched in 1653. She was renamed HMS Antelope on the restoration in 1660 and was sold in 1693.
- HMS Preston was a 48-gun fourth rate launched in 1698 as HMS Salisbury. She was captured by the French in 1703, retaken in 1708 and renamed HMS Preston in 1716. She was rebuilt in 1742, hulked in 1748 and broken up in 1749.
- HMS Preston (1757) was a 50-gun fourth rate launched in 1757. She was converted to a sheer hulk in 1785 and was broken up in 1815.

== See also ==
- HMCS Prestonian
