= Samuel W. Preston =

United States Navy officer (1840–1865)

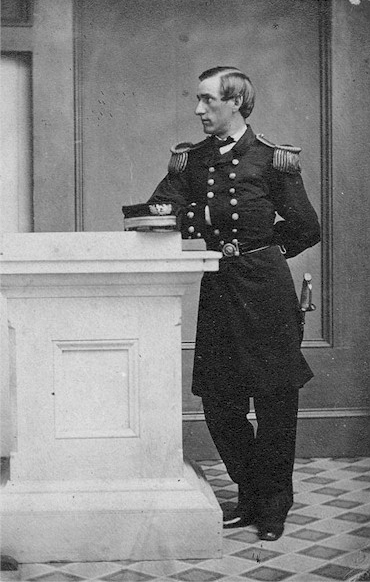
- Samuel W. Preston, c. 1861-62
- Born: April 6, 1842; London, Ontario, Canada
- Died: January 15, 1865 (aged 24); Fort Fisher, North Carolina, US
- Burial place: U.S. Naval Academy Cemetery, Annapolis, Maryland
- Military career
- Allegiance: United States
- Branch: United States Navy
- Service years: 1858–1865
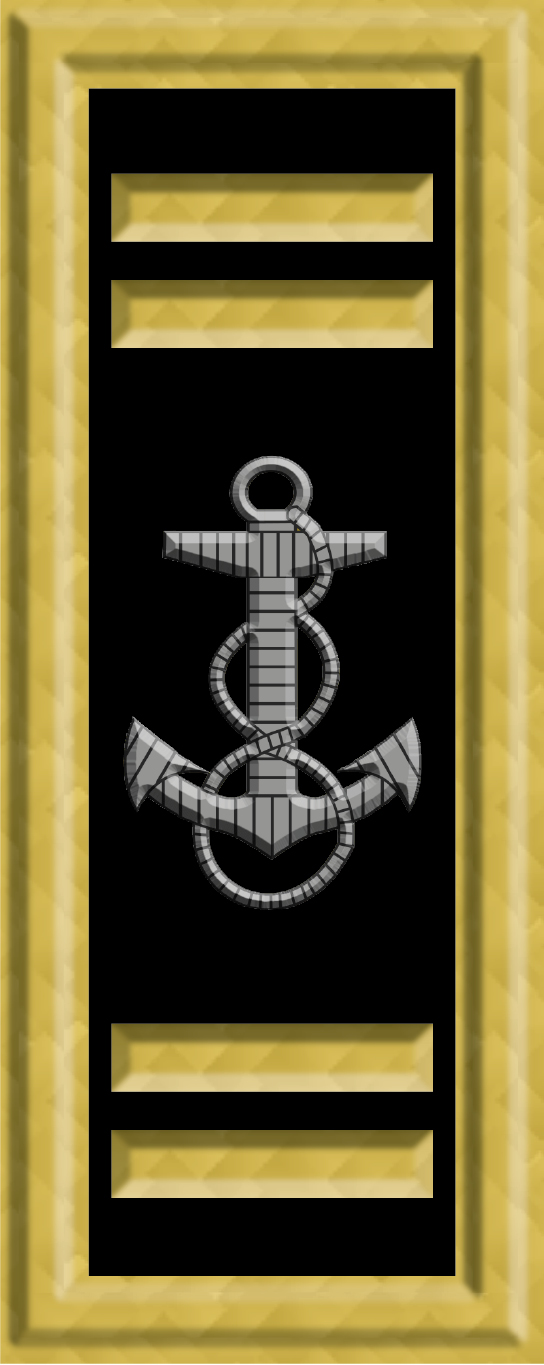
- Rank: Lieutenant
- Conflicts: American Civil War: Second Battle of Fort Sumter; First Battle of Fort Fisher; Second Battle of Fort Fisher †

Samuel William Preston (6 April 1842 – 15 January 1865) was an officer in the United States Navy during the American Civil War. He was killed in action during the Second Battle of Fort Fisher.

== Biography ==
Born near London, Ontario, Canada, Preston was appointed midshipman from the state of Illinois on 4 October 1858. Graduating first in his class, 9 May 1861, he was appointed Acting Master on 4 October 1861, and Lieutenant 1 August 1862. From 1861 to 1863 he served on various vessels attached to the South Atlantic Blockading Squadron. Captured by Confederate forces during an attack on Fort Sumter on 8 September 1863, he was taken to Columbia Prison of War Camp at Richland County Jail in Columbia, South Carolina, and exchanged in the fall of 1864.

Ordered to the North Atlantic Blockading Squadron as flag-lieutenant to Rear Admiral David Dixon Porter, he participated in the attacks on Fort Fisher on 24–25 December 1864, and 15 January 1865. He was killed while leading an amphibious assault of U.S. sailors and marines against the fort on the latter date.

== Namesakes ==
Six ships have been named USS Preston for him.
